

453001–453100 

|-bgcolor=#d6d6d6
| 453001 ||  || — || April 22, 2007 || Kitt Peak || Spacewatch || — || align=right | 2.2 km || 
|-id=002 bgcolor=#d6d6d6
| 453002 ||  || — || May 7, 2007 || Kitt Peak || Spacewatch || — || align=right | 4.0 km || 
|-id=003 bgcolor=#d6d6d6
| 453003 ||  || — || May 9, 2007 || Kitt Peak || Spacewatch || — || align=right | 2.5 km || 
|-id=004 bgcolor=#fefefe
| 453004 ||  || — || May 12, 2007 || Kitt Peak || Spacewatch || — || align=right data-sort-value="0.77" | 770 m || 
|-id=005 bgcolor=#d6d6d6
| 453005 ||  || — || May 14, 2007 || Tiki || S. F. Hönig, N. Teamo || — || align=right | 2.9 km || 
|-id=006 bgcolor=#d6d6d6
| 453006 ||  || — || April 20, 2007 || Kitt Peak || Spacewatch || — || align=right | 2.5 km || 
|-id=007 bgcolor=#fefefe
| 453007 ||  || — || May 13, 2007 || Mount Lemmon || Mount Lemmon Survey || — || align=right | 1.3 km || 
|-id=008 bgcolor=#d6d6d6
| 453008 ||  || — || April 24, 2007 || Mount Lemmon || Mount Lemmon Survey || — || align=right | 2.7 km || 
|-id=009 bgcolor=#fefefe
| 453009 ||  || — || June 8, 2007 || Kitt Peak || Spacewatch || NYS || align=right data-sort-value="0.69" | 690 m || 
|-id=010 bgcolor=#d6d6d6
| 453010 ||  || — || June 9, 2007 || Kitt Peak || Spacewatch || — || align=right | 4.0 km || 
|-id=011 bgcolor=#d6d6d6
| 453011 ||  || — || June 15, 2007 || Kitt Peak || Spacewatch || — || align=right | 3.3 km || 
|-id=012 bgcolor=#FA8072
| 453012 ||  || — || August 12, 2007 || Socorro || LINEAR || — || align=right data-sort-value="0.70" | 700 m || 
|-id=013 bgcolor=#fefefe
| 453013 ||  || — || August 17, 2007 || Purple Mountain || PMO NEO || (5026) || align=right data-sort-value="0.99" | 990 m || 
|-id=014 bgcolor=#fefefe
| 453014 ||  || — || August 21, 2007 || Anderson Mesa || LONEOS || NYS || align=right data-sort-value="0.71" | 710 m || 
|-id=015 bgcolor=#fefefe
| 453015 ||  || — || August 24, 2007 || Kitt Peak || Spacewatch || NYScritical || align=right data-sort-value="0.58" | 580 m || 
|-id=016 bgcolor=#fefefe
| 453016 ||  || — || December 23, 2000 || Kitt Peak || Spacewatch || — || align=right | 1.1 km || 
|-id=017 bgcolor=#fefefe
| 453017 ||  || — || August 22, 2007 || Anderson Mesa || LONEOS || NYS || align=right data-sort-value="0.86" | 860 m || 
|-id=018 bgcolor=#fefefe
| 453018 ||  || — || August 22, 2007 || Anderson Mesa || LONEOS || MAS || align=right data-sort-value="0.83" | 830 m || 
|-id=019 bgcolor=#fefefe
| 453019 ||  || — || August 10, 2007 || Kitt Peak || Spacewatch || NYS || align=right data-sort-value="0.63" | 630 m || 
|-id=020 bgcolor=#fefefe
| 453020 ||  || — || August 23, 2007 || Kitt Peak || Spacewatch || — || align=right data-sort-value="0.86" | 860 m || 
|-id=021 bgcolor=#fefefe
| 453021 ||  || — || September 3, 2007 || Catalina || CSS || — || align=right data-sort-value="0.86" | 860 m || 
|-id=022 bgcolor=#fefefe
| 453022 ||  || — || September 9, 2007 || Kitt Peak || Spacewatch || V || align=right data-sort-value="0.76" | 760 m || 
|-id=023 bgcolor=#fefefe
| 453023 ||  || — || August 21, 2007 || Anderson Mesa || LONEOS || — || align=right data-sort-value="0.79" | 790 m || 
|-id=024 bgcolor=#fefefe
| 453024 ||  || — || September 11, 2007 || Kitt Peak || Spacewatch || — || align=right data-sort-value="0.78" | 780 m || 
|-id=025 bgcolor=#fefefe
| 453025 ||  || — || August 21, 2007 || Anderson Mesa || LONEOS || — || align=right data-sort-value="0.91" | 910 m || 
|-id=026 bgcolor=#fefefe
| 453026 ||  || — || September 13, 2007 || Mount Lemmon || Mount Lemmon Survey || NYScritical || align=right data-sort-value="0.66" | 660 m || 
|-id=027 bgcolor=#fefefe
| 453027 ||  || — || September 10, 2007 || Kitt Peak || Spacewatch || — || align=right | 1.1 km || 
|-id=028 bgcolor=#fefefe
| 453028 ||  || — || September 10, 2007 || Kitt Peak || Spacewatch || — || align=right data-sort-value="0.78" | 780 m || 
|-id=029 bgcolor=#fefefe
| 453029 ||  || — || July 18, 2007 || Mount Lemmon || Mount Lemmon Survey || MAScritical || align=right data-sort-value="0.68" | 680 m || 
|-id=030 bgcolor=#fefefe
| 453030 ||  || — || September 13, 2007 || Mount Lemmon || Mount Lemmon Survey || — || align=right data-sort-value="0.54" | 540 m || 
|-id=031 bgcolor=#fefefe
| 453031 ||  || — || September 15, 2007 || Mount Lemmon || Mount Lemmon Survey || — || align=right data-sort-value="0.68" | 680 m || 
|-id=032 bgcolor=#fefefe
| 453032 ||  || — || September 13, 2007 || Mount Lemmon || Mount Lemmon Survey || critical || align=right data-sort-value="0.57" | 570 m || 
|-id=033 bgcolor=#fefefe
| 453033 ||  || — || September 4, 2007 || Catalina || CSS || — || align=right | 1.1 km || 
|-id=034 bgcolor=#fefefe
| 453034 ||  || — || September 6, 2007 || Anderson Mesa || LONEOS || — || align=right data-sort-value="0.71" | 710 m || 
|-id=035 bgcolor=#fefefe
| 453035 ||  || — || September 7, 2007 || Socorro || LINEAR || NYS || align=right data-sort-value="0.66" | 660 m || 
|-id=036 bgcolor=#fefefe
| 453036 ||  || — || September 9, 2007 || Kitt Peak || Spacewatch || NYS || align=right data-sort-value="0.80" | 800 m || 
|-id=037 bgcolor=#fefefe
| 453037 ||  || — || September 13, 2007 || Catalina || CSS || — || align=right | 1.1 km || 
|-id=038 bgcolor=#d6d6d6
| 453038 ||  || — || September 11, 2007 || Mount Lemmon || Mount Lemmon Survey || 7:4 || align=right | 3.5 km || 
|-id=039 bgcolor=#fefefe
| 453039 ||  || — || September 14, 2007 || Catalina || CSS || H || align=right data-sort-value="0.57" | 570 m || 
|-id=040 bgcolor=#fefefe
| 453040 ||  || — || September 16, 2007 || Socorro || LINEAR || MAS || align=right data-sort-value="0.82" | 820 m || 
|-id=041 bgcolor=#fefefe
| 453041 ||  || — || September 21, 2007 || Kitt Peak || Spacewatch || H || align=right data-sort-value="0.71" | 710 m || 
|-id=042 bgcolor=#fefefe
| 453042 ||  || — || August 21, 2007 || Anderson Mesa || LONEOS || MAS || align=right data-sort-value="0.82" | 820 m || 
|-id=043 bgcolor=#d6d6d6
| 453043 ||  || — || October 7, 2007 || Mount Lemmon || Mount Lemmon Survey || 3:2 || align=right | 3.2 km || 
|-id=044 bgcolor=#fefefe
| 453044 ||  || — || October 4, 2007 || Kitt Peak || Spacewatch || — || align=right data-sort-value="0.84" | 840 m || 
|-id=045 bgcolor=#fefefe
| 453045 ||  || — || October 4, 2007 || Kitt Peak || Spacewatch || — || align=right data-sort-value="0.94" | 940 m || 
|-id=046 bgcolor=#fefefe
| 453046 ||  || — || September 17, 2003 || Kitt Peak || Spacewatch || critical || align=right data-sort-value="0.62" | 620 m || 
|-id=047 bgcolor=#fefefe
| 453047 ||  || — || October 5, 2007 || Kitt Peak || Spacewatch || — || align=right data-sort-value="0.70" | 700 m || 
|-id=048 bgcolor=#fefefe
| 453048 ||  || — || October 12, 2007 || Socorro || LINEAR || H || align=right data-sort-value="0.63" | 630 m || 
|-id=049 bgcolor=#fefefe
| 453049 ||  || — || October 7, 2007 || Socorro || LINEAR || NYS || align=right data-sort-value="0.80" | 800 m || 
|-id=050 bgcolor=#fefefe
| 453050 ||  || — || October 9, 2007 || Socorro || LINEAR || — || align=right data-sort-value="0.89" | 890 m || 
|-id=051 bgcolor=#fefefe
| 453051 ||  || — || October 9, 2007 || Socorro || LINEAR || — || align=right data-sort-value="0.78" | 780 m || 
|-id=052 bgcolor=#fefefe
| 453052 ||  || — || September 12, 2007 || Mount Lemmon || Mount Lemmon Survey || critical || align=right data-sort-value="0.52" | 520 m || 
|-id=053 bgcolor=#fefefe
| 453053 ||  || — || October 8, 2007 || Kitt Peak || Spacewatch || — || align=right data-sort-value="0.89" | 890 m || 
|-id=054 bgcolor=#fefefe
| 453054 ||  || — || October 8, 2007 || Mount Lemmon || Mount Lemmon Survey || — || align=right data-sort-value="0.78" | 780 m || 
|-id=055 bgcolor=#d6d6d6
| 453055 ||  || — || October 8, 2007 || Kitt Peak || Spacewatch || 3:2critical || align=right | 3.2 km || 
|-id=056 bgcolor=#fefefe
| 453056 ||  || — || September 18, 2003 || Campo Imperatore || CINEOS || — || align=right data-sort-value="0.82" | 820 m || 
|-id=057 bgcolor=#fefefe
| 453057 ||  || — || October 8, 2007 || Mount Lemmon || Mount Lemmon Survey || — || align=right data-sort-value="0.75" | 750 m || 
|-id=058 bgcolor=#fefefe
| 453058 ||  || — || October 10, 2007 || Kitt Peak || Spacewatch || — || align=right data-sort-value="0.71" | 710 m || 
|-id=059 bgcolor=#E9E9E9
| 453059 ||  || — || September 13, 2007 || Mount Lemmon || Mount Lemmon Survey || — || align=right data-sort-value="0.85" | 850 m || 
|-id=060 bgcolor=#fefefe
| 453060 ||  || — || August 23, 2007 || Kitt Peak || Spacewatch || — || align=right data-sort-value="0.83" | 830 m || 
|-id=061 bgcolor=#fefefe
| 453061 ||  || — || September 14, 2007 || Catalina || CSS || — || align=right data-sort-value="0.94" | 940 m || 
|-id=062 bgcolor=#E9E9E9
| 453062 ||  || — || October 13, 2007 || Mount Lemmon || Mount Lemmon Survey || — || align=right | 1.0 km || 
|-id=063 bgcolor=#E9E9E9
| 453063 ||  || — || October 19, 2007 || Catalina || CSS || — || align=right | 2.3 km || 
|-id=064 bgcolor=#fefefe
| 453064 ||  || — || October 18, 2007 || Mount Lemmon || Mount Lemmon Survey || MAS || align=right data-sort-value="0.64" | 640 m || 
|-id=065 bgcolor=#fefefe
| 453065 ||  || — || October 18, 2007 || Mount Lemmon || Mount Lemmon Survey || critical || align=right data-sort-value="0.71" | 710 m || 
|-id=066 bgcolor=#fefefe
| 453066 ||  || — || October 16, 2007 || Mount Lemmon || Mount Lemmon Survey || NYS || align=right data-sort-value="0.62" | 620 m || 
|-id=067 bgcolor=#fefefe
| 453067 ||  || — || October 19, 2007 || Mount Lemmon || Mount Lemmon Survey || — || align=right data-sort-value="0.62" | 620 m || 
|-id=068 bgcolor=#E9E9E9
| 453068 ||  || — || October 24, 2007 || Mount Lemmon || Mount Lemmon Survey || (5) || align=right data-sort-value="0.82" | 820 m || 
|-id=069 bgcolor=#E9E9E9
| 453069 ||  || — || October 14, 2007 || Mount Lemmon || Mount Lemmon Survey || ADE || align=right | 1.9 km || 
|-id=070 bgcolor=#fefefe
| 453070 ||  || — || October 30, 2007 || Kitt Peak || Spacewatch || — || align=right data-sort-value="0.76" | 760 m || 
|-id=071 bgcolor=#fefefe
| 453071 ||  || — || October 30, 2007 || Kitt Peak || Spacewatch || MAS || align=right data-sort-value="0.75" | 750 m || 
|-id=072 bgcolor=#E9E9E9
| 453072 ||  || — || September 10, 2007 || Mount Lemmon || Mount Lemmon Survey || — || align=right data-sort-value="0.75" | 750 m || 
|-id=073 bgcolor=#fefefe
| 453073 ||  || — || October 17, 2007 || Mount Lemmon || Mount Lemmon Survey || — || align=right data-sort-value="0.98" | 980 m || 
|-id=074 bgcolor=#fefefe
| 453074 ||  || — || November 3, 2007 || Catalina || CSS || H || align=right data-sort-value="0.68" | 680 m || 
|-id=075 bgcolor=#E9E9E9
| 453075 ||  || — || October 20, 2007 || Mount Lemmon || Mount Lemmon Survey || — || align=right data-sort-value="0.88" | 880 m || 
|-id=076 bgcolor=#E9E9E9
| 453076 ||  || — || October 20, 2007 || Mount Lemmon || Mount Lemmon Survey || (5) || align=right data-sort-value="0.90" | 900 m || 
|-id=077 bgcolor=#d6d6d6
| 453077 ||  || — || November 2, 2007 || Kitt Peak || Spacewatch || Tj (2.96) || align=right | 3.9 km || 
|-id=078 bgcolor=#E9E9E9
| 453078 ||  || — || October 9, 2007 || Mount Lemmon || Mount Lemmon Survey || — || align=right data-sort-value="0.81" | 810 m || 
|-id=079 bgcolor=#E9E9E9
| 453079 ||  || — || November 3, 2007 || Kitt Peak || Spacewatch || — || align=right data-sort-value="0.96" | 960 m || 
|-id=080 bgcolor=#fefefe
| 453080 ||  || — || November 1, 2007 || Kitt Peak || Spacewatch || — || align=right data-sort-value="0.86" | 860 m || 
|-id=081 bgcolor=#fefefe
| 453081 ||  || — || November 1, 2007 || Kitt Peak || Spacewatch || — || align=right data-sort-value="0.84" | 840 m || 
|-id=082 bgcolor=#E9E9E9
| 453082 ||  || — || September 14, 2007 || Mount Lemmon || Mount Lemmon Survey || — || align=right | 1.1 km || 
|-id=083 bgcolor=#E9E9E9
| 453083 ||  || — || November 3, 2007 || Kitt Peak || Spacewatch || — || align=right data-sort-value="0.75" | 750 m || 
|-id=084 bgcolor=#fefefe
| 453084 ||  || — || November 2, 2007 || Mount Lemmon || Mount Lemmon Survey || — || align=right | 1.1 km || 
|-id=085 bgcolor=#E9E9E9
| 453085 ||  || — || November 5, 2007 || Kitt Peak || Spacewatch || — || align=right data-sort-value="0.93" | 930 m || 
|-id=086 bgcolor=#E9E9E9
| 453086 ||  || — || November 5, 2007 || Kitt Peak || Spacewatch || — || align=right | 1.0 km || 
|-id=087 bgcolor=#d6d6d6
| 453087 ||  || — || November 5, 2007 || Kitt Peak || Spacewatch || criticalTj (2.95) || align=right | 2.8 km || 
|-id=088 bgcolor=#E9E9E9
| 453088 ||  || — || November 5, 2007 || Kitt Peak || Spacewatch || — || align=right | 1.8 km || 
|-id=089 bgcolor=#E9E9E9
| 453089 ||  || — || November 4, 2007 || Kitt Peak || Spacewatch || — || align=right data-sort-value="0.70" | 700 m || 
|-id=090 bgcolor=#E9E9E9
| 453090 ||  || — || November 5, 2007 || Mount Lemmon || Mount Lemmon Survey || (5) || align=right data-sort-value="0.93" | 930 m || 
|-id=091 bgcolor=#E9E9E9
| 453091 ||  || — || November 5, 2007 || Mount Lemmon || Mount Lemmon Survey || — || align=right | 1.1 km || 
|-id=092 bgcolor=#E9E9E9
| 453092 ||  || — || November 7, 2007 || Mount Lemmon || Mount Lemmon Survey || — || align=right data-sort-value="0.87" | 870 m || 
|-id=093 bgcolor=#fefefe
| 453093 ||  || — || November 7, 2007 || Mount Lemmon || Mount Lemmon Survey || H || align=right data-sort-value="0.58" | 580 m || 
|-id=094 bgcolor=#FA8072
| 453094 ||  || — || September 25, 2007 || Mount Lemmon || Mount Lemmon Survey || H || align=right data-sort-value="0.78" | 780 m || 
|-id=095 bgcolor=#E9E9E9
| 453095 ||  || — || November 5, 2007 || Kitt Peak || Spacewatch || — || align=right data-sort-value="0.87" | 870 m || 
|-id=096 bgcolor=#E9E9E9
| 453096 ||  || — || November 9, 2007 || Catalina || CSS || — || align=right | 1.4 km || 
|-id=097 bgcolor=#E9E9E9
| 453097 ||  || — || November 5, 2007 || Mount Lemmon || Mount Lemmon Survey || — || align=right | 1.1 km || 
|-id=098 bgcolor=#E9E9E9
| 453098 ||  || — || November 2, 2007 || Kitt Peak || Spacewatch || — || align=right data-sort-value="0.65" | 650 m || 
|-id=099 bgcolor=#E9E9E9
| 453099 ||  || — || November 9, 2007 || Kitt Peak || Spacewatch || EUN || align=right | 1.1 km || 
|-id=100 bgcolor=#FFC2E0
| 453100 ||  || — || November 19, 2007 || Kitt Peak || Spacewatch || AMOcritical || align=right data-sort-value="0.59" | 590 m || 
|}

453101–453200 

|-bgcolor=#E9E9E9
| 453101 ||  || — || November 19, 2007 || Mount Lemmon || Mount Lemmon Survey || — || align=right data-sort-value="0.94" | 940 m || 
|-id=102 bgcolor=#d6d6d6
| 453102 ||  || — || October 10, 2007 || Kitt Peak || Spacewatch || 3:2 || align=right | 3.4 km || 
|-id=103 bgcolor=#E9E9E9
| 453103 ||  || — || November 20, 2007 || Mount Lemmon || Mount Lemmon Survey || — || align=right | 1.7 km || 
|-id=104 bgcolor=#E9E9E9
| 453104 ||  || — || November 19, 2007 || Mount Lemmon || Mount Lemmon Survey || — || align=right | 1.4 km || 
|-id=105 bgcolor=#E9E9E9
| 453105 ||  || — || November 19, 2007 || Kitt Peak || Spacewatch || MAR || align=right | 1.1 km || 
|-id=106 bgcolor=#E9E9E9
| 453106 ||  || — || November 18, 2007 || Mount Lemmon || Mount Lemmon Survey || — || align=right | 2.9 km || 
|-id=107 bgcolor=#fefefe
| 453107 ||  || — || September 14, 2004 || Siding Spring || SSS || H || align=right data-sort-value="0.89" | 890 m || 
|-id=108 bgcolor=#fefefe
| 453108 ||  || — || December 10, 2007 || Socorro || LINEAR || H || align=right data-sort-value="0.72" | 720 m || 
|-id=109 bgcolor=#E9E9E9
| 453109 ||  || — || December 12, 2007 || La Sagra || OAM Obs. || — || align=right | 2.2 km || 
|-id=110 bgcolor=#E9E9E9
| 453110 ||  || — || December 3, 2007 || Kitt Peak || Spacewatch || — || align=right data-sort-value="0.91" | 910 m || 
|-id=111 bgcolor=#E9E9E9
| 453111 ||  || — || December 14, 2007 || Mount Lemmon || Mount Lemmon Survey || — || align=right | 1.2 km || 
|-id=112 bgcolor=#E9E9E9
| 453112 ||  || — || December 15, 2007 || Socorro || LINEAR || — || align=right | 1.2 km || 
|-id=113 bgcolor=#E9E9E9
| 453113 ||  || — || December 16, 2007 || Kitt Peak || Spacewatch || — || align=right data-sort-value="0.81" | 810 m || 
|-id=114 bgcolor=#E9E9E9
| 453114 ||  || — || December 17, 2007 || Mount Lemmon || Mount Lemmon Survey || — || align=right data-sort-value="0.82" | 820 m || 
|-id=115 bgcolor=#E9E9E9
| 453115 ||  || — || December 16, 2007 || Kitt Peak || Spacewatch || — || align=right | 1.3 km || 
|-id=116 bgcolor=#E9E9E9
| 453116 ||  || — || November 14, 2007 || Mount Lemmon || Mount Lemmon Survey || — || align=right data-sort-value="0.94" | 940 m || 
|-id=117 bgcolor=#E9E9E9
| 453117 ||  || — || December 4, 2007 || Kitt Peak || Spacewatch || — || align=right | 1.2 km || 
|-id=118 bgcolor=#E9E9E9
| 453118 ||  || — || December 28, 2007 || Kitt Peak || Spacewatch || — || align=right | 1.0 km || 
|-id=119 bgcolor=#E9E9E9
| 453119 ||  || — || November 5, 2007 || Kitt Peak || Spacewatch || — || align=right | 1.2 km || 
|-id=120 bgcolor=#E9E9E9
| 453120 ||  || — || December 30, 2007 || Kitt Peak || Spacewatch || — || align=right | 1.4 km || 
|-id=121 bgcolor=#E9E9E9
| 453121 ||  || — || December 28, 2007 || Kitt Peak || Spacewatch || — || align=right data-sort-value="0.88" | 880 m || 
|-id=122 bgcolor=#fefefe
| 453122 ||  || — || December 28, 2007 || Kitt Peak || Spacewatch || H || align=right data-sort-value="0.51" | 510 m || 
|-id=123 bgcolor=#fefefe
| 453123 ||  || — || December 6, 2007 || Mount Lemmon || Mount Lemmon Survey || H || align=right data-sort-value="0.80" | 800 m || 
|-id=124 bgcolor=#E9E9E9
| 453124 ||  || — || December 30, 2007 || Kitt Peak || Spacewatch || — || align=right | 1.6 km || 
|-id=125 bgcolor=#E9E9E9
| 453125 ||  || — || December 31, 2007 || Kitt Peak || Spacewatch || EUN || align=right data-sort-value="0.94" | 940 m || 
|-id=126 bgcolor=#fefefe
| 453126 ||  || — || December 31, 2007 || Catalina || CSS || H || align=right data-sort-value="0.89" | 890 m || 
|-id=127 bgcolor=#E9E9E9
| 453127 ||  || — || January 6, 2008 || La Sagra || OAM Obs. || — || align=right | 1.1 km || 
|-id=128 bgcolor=#E9E9E9
| 453128 ||  || — || January 10, 2008 || Mount Lemmon || Mount Lemmon Survey || — || align=right | 1.1 km || 
|-id=129 bgcolor=#E9E9E9
| 453129 ||  || — || January 10, 2008 || Mount Lemmon || Mount Lemmon Survey || — || align=right | 1.4 km || 
|-id=130 bgcolor=#fefefe
| 453130 ||  || — || December 18, 2007 || Mount Lemmon || Mount Lemmon Survey || H || align=right data-sort-value="0.68" | 680 m || 
|-id=131 bgcolor=#fefefe
| 453131 ||  || — || December 18, 2007 || Mount Lemmon || Mount Lemmon Survey || H || align=right data-sort-value="0.65" | 650 m || 
|-id=132 bgcolor=#fefefe
| 453132 ||  || — || December 31, 2007 || Kitt Peak || Spacewatch || H || align=right data-sort-value="0.74" | 740 m || 
|-id=133 bgcolor=#E9E9E9
| 453133 ||  || — || January 10, 2008 || Catalina || CSS || — || align=right data-sort-value="0.91" | 910 m || 
|-id=134 bgcolor=#E9E9E9
| 453134 ||  || — || January 10, 2008 || Lulin Observatory || LUSS || — || align=right | 1.2 km || 
|-id=135 bgcolor=#E9E9E9
| 453135 ||  || — || December 28, 2007 || Kitt Peak || Spacewatch || — || align=right | 1.0 km || 
|-id=136 bgcolor=#E9E9E9
| 453136 ||  || — || January 11, 2008 || Kitt Peak || Spacewatch || — || align=right | 1.1 km || 
|-id=137 bgcolor=#E9E9E9
| 453137 ||  || — || January 11, 2008 || Kitt Peak || Spacewatch || — || align=right data-sort-value="0.98" | 980 m || 
|-id=138 bgcolor=#E9E9E9
| 453138 ||  || — || January 11, 2008 || Mount Lemmon || Mount Lemmon Survey || — || align=right data-sort-value="0.73" | 730 m || 
|-id=139 bgcolor=#E9E9E9
| 453139 ||  || — || December 14, 2007 || Mount Lemmon || Mount Lemmon Survey || — || align=right | 1.1 km || 
|-id=140 bgcolor=#E9E9E9
| 453140 ||  || — || December 15, 2007 || Socorro || LINEAR || ADE || align=right | 1.7 km || 
|-id=141 bgcolor=#E9E9E9
| 453141 ||  || — || January 14, 2008 || Kitt Peak || Spacewatch || MAR || align=right data-sort-value="0.91" | 910 m || 
|-id=142 bgcolor=#E9E9E9
| 453142 ||  || — || January 14, 2008 || Kitt Peak || Spacewatch || — || align=right | 1.5 km || 
|-id=143 bgcolor=#E9E9E9
| 453143 ||  || — || January 14, 2008 || Kitt Peak || Spacewatch || (5) || align=right data-sort-value="0.66" | 660 m || 
|-id=144 bgcolor=#E9E9E9
| 453144 ||  || — || January 15, 2008 || Kitt Peak || Spacewatch || — || align=right | 1.5 km || 
|-id=145 bgcolor=#E9E9E9
| 453145 ||  || — || January 13, 2008 || Kitt Peak || Spacewatch || — || align=right | 1.9 km || 
|-id=146 bgcolor=#E9E9E9
| 453146 ||  || — || January 12, 2008 || Catalina || CSS || — || align=right | 1.5 km || 
|-id=147 bgcolor=#E9E9E9
| 453147 ||  || — || January 10, 2008 || Mount Lemmon || Mount Lemmon Survey || — || align=right data-sort-value="0.90" | 900 m || 
|-id=148 bgcolor=#E9E9E9
| 453148 ||  || — || September 17, 2006 || Kitt Peak || Spacewatch || — || align=right data-sort-value="0.89" | 890 m || 
|-id=149 bgcolor=#E9E9E9
| 453149 ||  || — || January 30, 2008 || Mount Lemmon || Mount Lemmon Survey || — || align=right | 1.2 km || 
|-id=150 bgcolor=#E9E9E9
| 453150 ||  || — || November 11, 2007 || Mount Lemmon || Mount Lemmon Survey || — || align=right data-sort-value="0.94" | 940 m || 
|-id=151 bgcolor=#E9E9E9
| 453151 ||  || — || January 18, 2008 || Kitt Peak || Spacewatch || — || align=right | 1.9 km || 
|-id=152 bgcolor=#E9E9E9
| 453152 ||  || — || January 10, 2008 || Kitt Peak || Spacewatch || AGN || align=right | 1.3 km || 
|-id=153 bgcolor=#E9E9E9
| 453153 ||  || — || February 3, 2008 || Kitt Peak || Spacewatch || — || align=right | 1.4 km || 
|-id=154 bgcolor=#fefefe
| 453154 ||  || — || February 2, 2008 || Kitt Peak || Spacewatch || H || align=right data-sort-value="0.94" | 940 m || 
|-id=155 bgcolor=#E9E9E9
| 453155 ||  || — || February 7, 2008 || Kitt Peak || Spacewatch || — || align=right | 1.2 km || 
|-id=156 bgcolor=#E9E9E9
| 453156 ||  || — || February 7, 2008 || Mount Lemmon || Mount Lemmon Survey || MIS || align=right | 2.5 km || 
|-id=157 bgcolor=#E9E9E9
| 453157 ||  || — || November 19, 2007 || Mount Lemmon || Mount Lemmon Survey || — || align=right | 1.0 km || 
|-id=158 bgcolor=#fefefe
| 453158 ||  || — || February 7, 2008 || Kitt Peak || Spacewatch || H || align=right data-sort-value="0.69" | 690 m || 
|-id=159 bgcolor=#E9E9E9
| 453159 ||  || — || February 8, 2008 || Kitt Peak || Spacewatch || — || align=right | 1.1 km || 
|-id=160 bgcolor=#E9E9E9
| 453160 ||  || — || February 9, 2008 || Kitt Peak || Spacewatch || — || align=right | 1.3 km || 
|-id=161 bgcolor=#E9E9E9
| 453161 ||  || — || February 9, 2008 || Kitt Peak || Spacewatch || — || align=right | 1.7 km || 
|-id=162 bgcolor=#E9E9E9
| 453162 ||  || — || February 11, 2008 || Kitt Peak || Spacewatch || — || align=right data-sort-value="0.92" | 920 m || 
|-id=163 bgcolor=#E9E9E9
| 453163 ||  || — || October 16, 2006 || Kitt Peak || Spacewatch || — || align=right | 1.5 km || 
|-id=164 bgcolor=#E9E9E9
| 453164 ||  || — || February 12, 2008 || Mount Lemmon || Mount Lemmon Survey || — || align=right | 2.7 km || 
|-id=165 bgcolor=#E9E9E9
| 453165 ||  || — || February 9, 2008 || Catalina || CSS || — || align=right | 1.6 km || 
|-id=166 bgcolor=#E9E9E9
| 453166 ||  || — || January 11, 2008 || Catalina || CSS || — || align=right | 1.2 km || 
|-id=167 bgcolor=#E9E9E9
| 453167 ||  || — || February 18, 2008 || Mount Lemmon || Mount Lemmon Survey || EUN || align=right | 1.3 km || 
|-id=168 bgcolor=#E9E9E9
| 453168 ||  || — || February 13, 2008 || Mount Lemmon || Mount Lemmon Survey || — || align=right | 1.8 km || 
|-id=169 bgcolor=#E9E9E9
| 453169 ||  || — || February 28, 2008 || Mount Lemmon || Mount Lemmon Survey || NEM || align=right | 1.8 km || 
|-id=170 bgcolor=#E9E9E9
| 453170 ||  || — || February 29, 2008 || Catalina || CSS || — || align=right | 2.0 km || 
|-id=171 bgcolor=#E9E9E9
| 453171 ||  || — || February 27, 2008 || Mount Lemmon || Mount Lemmon Survey || — || align=right | 1.0 km || 
|-id=172 bgcolor=#E9E9E9
| 453172 ||  || — || February 28, 2008 || Kitt Peak || Spacewatch || — || align=right | 1.2 km || 
|-id=173 bgcolor=#E9E9E9
| 453173 ||  || — || February 2, 2008 || Mount Lemmon || Mount Lemmon Survey || — || align=right | 1.4 km || 
|-id=174 bgcolor=#E9E9E9
| 453174 ||  || — || March 1, 2008 || Kitt Peak || Spacewatch || — || align=right | 1.4 km || 
|-id=175 bgcolor=#E9E9E9
| 453175 ||  || — || January 8, 2003 || Socorro || LINEAR || DOR || align=right | 3.1 km || 
|-id=176 bgcolor=#E9E9E9
| 453176 ||  || — || January 31, 2008 || Mount Lemmon || Mount Lemmon Survey || — || align=right | 1.3 km || 
|-id=177 bgcolor=#E9E9E9
| 453177 ||  || — || March 4, 2008 || Kitt Peak || Spacewatch || — || align=right | 2.0 km || 
|-id=178 bgcolor=#E9E9E9
| 453178 ||  || — || February 11, 2008 || Kitt Peak || Spacewatch || — || align=right | 1.4 km || 
|-id=179 bgcolor=#E9E9E9
| 453179 ||  || — || March 4, 2008 || Socorro || LINEAR || JUN || align=right | 1.2 km || 
|-id=180 bgcolor=#E9E9E9
| 453180 ||  || — || March 9, 2008 || Mount Lemmon || Mount Lemmon Survey ||  || align=right | 1.8 km || 
|-id=181 bgcolor=#E9E9E9
| 453181 ||  || — || March 6, 2008 || Mount Lemmon || Mount Lemmon Survey || — || align=right | 1.5 km || 
|-id=182 bgcolor=#E9E9E9
| 453182 ||  || — || March 8, 2008 || Kitt Peak || Spacewatch || EUN || align=right | 1.1 km || 
|-id=183 bgcolor=#E9E9E9
| 453183 ||  || — || March 1, 2008 || Kitt Peak || Spacewatch || — || align=right | 2.5 km || 
|-id=184 bgcolor=#d6d6d6
| 453184 ||  || — || March 9, 2008 || Kitt Peak || Spacewatch || — || align=right | 2.9 km || 
|-id=185 bgcolor=#E9E9E9
| 453185 ||  || — || December 16, 2007 || Mount Lemmon || Mount Lemmon Survey || — || align=right | 1.0 km || 
|-id=186 bgcolor=#E9E9E9
| 453186 ||  || — || March 11, 2008 || Kitt Peak || Spacewatch || MRX || align=right data-sort-value="0.96" | 960 m || 
|-id=187 bgcolor=#E9E9E9
| 453187 ||  || — || March 11, 2008 || Mount Lemmon || Mount Lemmon Survey || — || align=right | 1.0 km || 
|-id=188 bgcolor=#E9E9E9
| 453188 ||  || — || March 15, 2008 || Mount Lemmon || Mount Lemmon Survey || AGN || align=right | 1.1 km || 
|-id=189 bgcolor=#E9E9E9
| 453189 ||  || — || February 27, 2008 || Mount Lemmon || Mount Lemmon Survey || — || align=right | 1.2 km || 
|-id=190 bgcolor=#E9E9E9
| 453190 ||  || — || March 27, 2008 || Kitt Peak || Spacewatch || — || align=right | 1.8 km || 
|-id=191 bgcolor=#d6d6d6
| 453191 ||  || — || March 27, 2008 || Kitt Peak || Spacewatch || — || align=right | 4.4 km || 
|-id=192 bgcolor=#E9E9E9
| 453192 ||  || — || March 28, 2008 || Mount Lemmon || Mount Lemmon Survey || — || align=right | 1.7 km || 
|-id=193 bgcolor=#E9E9E9
| 453193 ||  || — || March 29, 2008 || Kitt Peak || Spacewatch || — || align=right | 1.9 km || 
|-id=194 bgcolor=#E9E9E9
| 453194 ||  || — || January 10, 2008 || Mount Lemmon || Mount Lemmon Survey || MIS || align=right | 2.1 km || 
|-id=195 bgcolor=#E9E9E9
| 453195 ||  || — || March 30, 2008 || Kitt Peak || Spacewatch || — || align=right | 2.0 km || 
|-id=196 bgcolor=#E9E9E9
| 453196 ||  || — || March 27, 2008 || Mount Lemmon || Mount Lemmon Survey || — || align=right | 1.7 km || 
|-id=197 bgcolor=#d6d6d6
| 453197 ||  || — || March 12, 2008 || Kitt Peak || Spacewatch || — || align=right | 2.3 km || 
|-id=198 bgcolor=#E9E9E9
| 453198 ||  || — || March 30, 2008 || Kitt Peak || Spacewatch || MRX || align=right | 1.1 km || 
|-id=199 bgcolor=#E9E9E9
| 453199 ||  || — || March 30, 2008 || Kitt Peak || Spacewatch || — || align=right | 1.8 km || 
|-id=200 bgcolor=#E9E9E9
| 453200 ||  || — || March 27, 2008 || Kitt Peak || Spacewatch || — || align=right | 1.6 km || 
|}

453201–453300 

|-bgcolor=#C2FFFF
| 453201 ||  || — || March 29, 2008 || Kitt Peak || Spacewatch || L5 || align=right | 9.6 km || 
|-id=202 bgcolor=#E9E9E9
| 453202 ||  || — || April 4, 2008 || Kitt Peak || Spacewatch || — || align=right | 1.9 km || 
|-id=203 bgcolor=#E9E9E9
| 453203 ||  || — || April 5, 2008 || Kitt Peak || Spacewatch || — || align=right | 2.0 km || 
|-id=204 bgcolor=#d6d6d6
| 453204 ||  || — || April 7, 2008 || Kitt Peak || Spacewatch || Tj (2.99) || align=right | 3.0 km || 
|-id=205 bgcolor=#d6d6d6
| 453205 ||  || — || April 7, 2008 || Mount Lemmon || Mount Lemmon Survey || EOS || align=right | 1.5 km || 
|-id=206 bgcolor=#E9E9E9
| 453206 ||  || — || April 11, 2008 || Mount Lemmon || Mount Lemmon Survey || HOF || align=right | 2.9 km || 
|-id=207 bgcolor=#FA8072
| 453207 ||  || — || February 3, 2008 || Catalina || CSS || — || align=right | 1.3 km || 
|-id=208 bgcolor=#E9E9E9
| 453208 ||  || — || March 29, 2008 || Catalina || CSS || — || align=right | 2.9 km || 
|-id=209 bgcolor=#E9E9E9
| 453209 ||  || — || March 10, 2008 || Kitt Peak || Spacewatch || AGN || align=right | 1.00 km || 
|-id=210 bgcolor=#d6d6d6
| 453210 ||  || — || April 14, 2008 || Mount Lemmon || Mount Lemmon Survey || — || align=right | 2.7 km || 
|-id=211 bgcolor=#E9E9E9
| 453211 ||  || — || April 14, 2008 || Mount Lemmon || Mount Lemmon Survey || — || align=right | 2.1 km || 
|-id=212 bgcolor=#d6d6d6
| 453212 ||  || — || April 24, 2008 || Kitt Peak || Spacewatch || — || align=right | 3.3 km || 
|-id=213 bgcolor=#d6d6d6
| 453213 ||  || — || April 24, 2008 || Kitt Peak || Spacewatch || EOS || align=right | 1.6 km || 
|-id=214 bgcolor=#E9E9E9
| 453214 ||  || — || April 25, 2008 || Kitt Peak || Spacewatch || MAR || align=right | 1.1 km || 
|-id=215 bgcolor=#E9E9E9
| 453215 ||  || — || March 11, 2008 || Kitt Peak || Spacewatch || — || align=right | 2.1 km || 
|-id=216 bgcolor=#d6d6d6
| 453216 ||  || — || April 26, 2008 || Kitt Peak || Spacewatch || — || align=right | 3.4 km || 
|-id=217 bgcolor=#E9E9E9
| 453217 ||  || — || April 27, 2008 || Kitt Peak || Spacewatch || — || align=right | 1.2 km || 
|-id=218 bgcolor=#d6d6d6
| 453218 ||  || — || March 15, 2008 || Mount Lemmon || Mount Lemmon Survey || — || align=right | 3.0 km || 
|-id=219 bgcolor=#d6d6d6
| 453219 ||  || — || November 26, 2005 || Kitt Peak || Spacewatch || EOS || align=right | 2.5 km || 
|-id=220 bgcolor=#d6d6d6
| 453220 ||  || — || April 14, 2008 || Kitt Peak || Spacewatch || — || align=right | 2.1 km || 
|-id=221 bgcolor=#d6d6d6
| 453221 ||  || — || April 29, 2008 || Kitt Peak || Spacewatch || — || align=right | 2.2 km || 
|-id=222 bgcolor=#d6d6d6
| 453222 ||  || — || April 24, 2008 || Kitt Peak || Spacewatch || — || align=right | 3.4 km || 
|-id=223 bgcolor=#C2FFFF
| 453223 ||  || — || April 27, 2008 || Kitt Peak || Spacewatch || L5 || align=right | 11 km || 
|-id=224 bgcolor=#d6d6d6
| 453224 ||  || — || April 14, 2008 || Kitt Peak || Spacewatch || — || align=right | 2.6 km || 
|-id=225 bgcolor=#d6d6d6
| 453225 ||  || — || April 3, 2008 || Kitt Peak || Spacewatch || — || align=right | 2.7 km || 
|-id=226 bgcolor=#E9E9E9
| 453226 ||  || — || April 6, 2008 || Mount Lemmon || Mount Lemmon Survey || — || align=right | 2.2 km || 
|-id=227 bgcolor=#E9E9E9
| 453227 ||  || — || April 6, 2008 || Mount Lemmon || Mount Lemmon Survey || EUN || align=right | 1.1 km || 
|-id=228 bgcolor=#d6d6d6
| 453228 ||  || — || May 2, 2008 || Catalina || CSS || — || align=right | 3.1 km || 
|-id=229 bgcolor=#d6d6d6
| 453229 ||  || — || May 29, 2008 || Mount Lemmon || Mount Lemmon Survey || — || align=right | 4.5 km || 
|-id=230 bgcolor=#C2FFFF
| 453230 ||  || — || May 27, 2008 || Kitt Peak || Spacewatch || L5 || align=right | 8.4 km || 
|-id=231 bgcolor=#d6d6d6
| 453231 ||  || — || May 11, 2008 || Mount Lemmon || Mount Lemmon Survey || — || align=right | 2.7 km || 
|-id=232 bgcolor=#d6d6d6
| 453232 ||  || — || May 12, 2008 || Siding Spring || SSS || — || align=right | 3.7 km || 
|-id=233 bgcolor=#d6d6d6
| 453233 ||  || — || June 8, 2008 || Kitt Peak || Spacewatch || Tj (2.97) || align=right | 3.9 km || 
|-id=234 bgcolor=#fefefe
| 453234 ||  || — || July 30, 2008 || Kitt Peak || Spacewatch || — || align=right data-sort-value="0.80" | 800 m || 
|-id=235 bgcolor=#FA8072
| 453235 ||  || — || August 3, 2008 || Marly || P. Kocher || — || align=right data-sort-value="0.54" | 540 m || 
|-id=236 bgcolor=#fefefe
| 453236 ||  || — || July 26, 2008 || Siding Spring || SSS || — || align=right data-sort-value="0.70" | 700 m || 
|-id=237 bgcolor=#fefefe
| 453237 ||  || — || August 27, 2008 || La Sagra || OAM Obs. || — || align=right data-sort-value="0.79" | 790 m || 
|-id=238 bgcolor=#fefefe
| 453238 ||  || — || July 29, 2008 || Kitt Peak || Spacewatch || — || align=right data-sort-value="0.65" | 650 m || 
|-id=239 bgcolor=#d6d6d6
| 453239 ||  || — || November 30, 2003 || Kitt Peak || Spacewatch || — || align=right | 2.4 km || 
|-id=240 bgcolor=#fefefe
| 453240 ||  || — || September 3, 2008 || Kitt Peak || Spacewatch || — || align=right data-sort-value="0.50" | 500 m || 
|-id=241 bgcolor=#fefefe
| 453241 ||  || — || September 4, 2008 || Kitt Peak || Spacewatch || — || align=right data-sort-value="0.64" | 640 m || 
|-id=242 bgcolor=#FA8072
| 453242 ||  || — || September 7, 2008 || Mount Lemmon || Mount Lemmon Survey || — || align=right data-sort-value="0.42" | 420 m || 
|-id=243 bgcolor=#fefefe
| 453243 ||  || — || September 4, 2008 || Kitt Peak || Spacewatch || — || align=right data-sort-value="0.61" | 610 m || 
|-id=244 bgcolor=#fefefe
| 453244 ||  || — || September 5, 2008 || Kitt Peak || Spacewatch || — || align=right data-sort-value="0.68" | 680 m || 
|-id=245 bgcolor=#fefefe
| 453245 ||  || — || September 19, 2008 || Kitt Peak || Spacewatch || — || align=right data-sort-value="0.73" | 730 m || 
|-id=246 bgcolor=#fefefe
| 453246 ||  || — || September 4, 2008 || Kitt Peak || Spacewatch || — || align=right data-sort-value="0.68" | 680 m || 
|-id=247 bgcolor=#fefefe
| 453247 ||  || — || September 20, 2008 || Kitt Peak || Spacewatch || — || align=right data-sort-value="0.68" | 680 m || 
|-id=248 bgcolor=#fefefe
| 453248 ||  || — || November 30, 2005 || Mount Lemmon || Mount Lemmon Survey || — || align=right data-sort-value="0.60" | 600 m || 
|-id=249 bgcolor=#fefefe
| 453249 ||  || — || September 20, 2008 || Mount Lemmon || Mount Lemmon Survey || — || align=right data-sort-value="0.64" | 640 m || 
|-id=250 bgcolor=#fefefe
| 453250 ||  || — || September 20, 2008 || Catalina || CSS || — || align=right data-sort-value="0.67" | 670 m || 
|-id=251 bgcolor=#fefefe
| 453251 ||  || — || September 20, 2008 || Kitt Peak || Spacewatch || — || align=right data-sort-value="0.84" | 840 m || 
|-id=252 bgcolor=#fefefe
| 453252 ||  || — || September 21, 2008 || Catalina || CSS || — || align=right data-sort-value="0.75" | 750 m || 
|-id=253 bgcolor=#fefefe
| 453253 ||  || — || September 9, 2008 || Mount Lemmon || Mount Lemmon Survey || — || align=right data-sort-value="0.62" | 620 m || 
|-id=254 bgcolor=#fefefe
| 453254 ||  || — || September 22, 2008 || Kitt Peak || Spacewatch || — || align=right data-sort-value="0.71" | 710 m || 
|-id=255 bgcolor=#fefefe
| 453255 ||  || — || September 23, 2008 || Kitt Peak || Spacewatch || — || align=right data-sort-value="0.85" | 850 m || 
|-id=256 bgcolor=#fefefe
| 453256 Gucevičius ||  ||  || September 23, 2008 || Moletai || Molėtai Obs. || — || align=right data-sort-value="0.82" | 820 m || 
|-id=257 bgcolor=#d6d6d6
| 453257 ||  || — || September 24, 2008 || Mount Lemmon || Mount Lemmon Survey || 7:4 || align=right | 4.8 km || 
|-id=258 bgcolor=#fefefe
| 453258 ||  || — || September 24, 2008 || Socorro || LINEAR || — || align=right data-sort-value="0.73" | 730 m || 
|-id=259 bgcolor=#fefefe
| 453259 ||  || — || September 28, 2008 || Socorro || LINEAR || — || align=right data-sort-value="0.61" | 610 m || 
|-id=260 bgcolor=#fefefe
| 453260 ||  || — || September 24, 2008 || Kitt Peak || Spacewatch || — || align=right data-sort-value="0.55" | 550 m || 
|-id=261 bgcolor=#fefefe
| 453261 ||  || — || September 25, 2008 || Mount Lemmon || Mount Lemmon Survey || — || align=right data-sort-value="0.50" | 500 m || 
|-id=262 bgcolor=#fefefe
| 453262 ||  || — || September 25, 2008 || Kitt Peak || Spacewatch || V || align=right data-sort-value="0.46" | 460 m || 
|-id=263 bgcolor=#fefefe
| 453263 ||  || — || September 26, 2008 || Kitt Peak || Spacewatch || — || align=right data-sort-value="0.66" | 660 m || 
|-id=264 bgcolor=#fefefe
| 453264 ||  || — || August 24, 2008 || Kitt Peak || Spacewatch || — || align=right data-sort-value="0.85" | 850 m || 
|-id=265 bgcolor=#fefefe
| 453265 ||  || — || September 29, 2008 || Mount Lemmon || Mount Lemmon Survey || — || align=right data-sort-value="0.57" | 570 m || 
|-id=266 bgcolor=#fefefe
| 453266 ||  || — || September 29, 2008 || Catalina || CSS || — || align=right data-sort-value="0.59" | 590 m || 
|-id=267 bgcolor=#fefefe
| 453267 ||  || — || September 3, 2008 || Kitt Peak || Spacewatch || — || align=right data-sort-value="0.65" | 650 m || 
|-id=268 bgcolor=#fefefe
| 453268 ||  || — || September 20, 2008 || Kitt Peak || Spacewatch || — || align=right data-sort-value="0.56" | 560 m || 
|-id=269 bgcolor=#fefefe
| 453269 ||  || — || September 23, 2008 || Mount Lemmon || Mount Lemmon Survey || NYS || align=right data-sort-value="0.60" | 600 m || 
|-id=270 bgcolor=#FA8072
| 453270 ||  || — || September 29, 2008 || Catalina || CSS || — || align=right data-sort-value="0.54" | 540 m || 
|-id=271 bgcolor=#fefefe
| 453271 ||  || — || September 23, 2008 || Kitt Peak || Spacewatch || — || align=right data-sort-value="0.76" | 760 m || 
|-id=272 bgcolor=#fefefe
| 453272 ||  || — || September 23, 2008 || Kitt Peak || Spacewatch || — || align=right data-sort-value="0.71" | 710 m || 
|-id=273 bgcolor=#fefefe
| 453273 ||  || — || September 26, 2008 || Kitt Peak || Spacewatch || — || align=right data-sort-value="0.60" | 600 m || 
|-id=274 bgcolor=#fefefe
| 453274 ||  || — || September 29, 2008 || Mount Lemmon || Mount Lemmon Survey || V || align=right data-sort-value="0.58" | 580 m || 
|-id=275 bgcolor=#fefefe
| 453275 ||  || — || October 1, 2008 || Kitt Peak || Spacewatch || — || align=right data-sort-value="0.59" | 590 m || 
|-id=276 bgcolor=#fefefe
| 453276 ||  || — || October 1, 2008 || Mount Lemmon || Mount Lemmon Survey || Vcritical || align=right data-sort-value="0.47" | 470 m || 
|-id=277 bgcolor=#d6d6d6
| 453277 ||  || — || October 1, 2008 || Mount Lemmon || Mount Lemmon Survey || — || align=right | 3.3 km || 
|-id=278 bgcolor=#fefefe
| 453278 ||  || — || October 1, 2008 || Mount Lemmon || Mount Lemmon Survey || — || align=right data-sort-value="0.56" | 560 m || 
|-id=279 bgcolor=#fefefe
| 453279 ||  || — || September 23, 2008 || Kitt Peak || Spacewatch || — || align=right data-sort-value="0.73" | 730 m || 
|-id=280 bgcolor=#fefefe
| 453280 ||  || — || October 2, 2008 || Kitt Peak || Spacewatch || — || align=right data-sort-value="0.68" | 680 m || 
|-id=281 bgcolor=#fefefe
| 453281 ||  || — || October 2, 2008 || Kitt Peak || Spacewatch || — || align=right data-sort-value="0.69" | 690 m || 
|-id=282 bgcolor=#fefefe
| 453282 ||  || — || September 6, 2008 || Mount Lemmon || Mount Lemmon Survey || — || align=right data-sort-value="0.59" | 590 m || 
|-id=283 bgcolor=#fefefe
| 453283 ||  || — || October 3, 2008 || Kitt Peak || Spacewatch || — || align=right data-sort-value="0.58" | 580 m || 
|-id=284 bgcolor=#fefefe
| 453284 ||  || — || February 25, 2006 || Mount Lemmon || Mount Lemmon Survey || NYS || align=right data-sort-value="0.46" | 460 m || 
|-id=285 bgcolor=#fefefe
| 453285 ||  || — || October 3, 2008 || La Sagra || OAM Obs. || — || align=right data-sort-value="0.68" | 680 m || 
|-id=286 bgcolor=#fefefe
| 453286 ||  || — || September 22, 2008 || Kitt Peak || Spacewatch || — || align=right data-sort-value="0.86" | 860 m || 
|-id=287 bgcolor=#fefefe
| 453287 ||  || — || October 6, 2008 || Catalina || CSS || (2076) || align=right data-sort-value="0.74" | 740 m || 
|-id=288 bgcolor=#d6d6d6
| 453288 ||  || — || October 1, 2008 || Kitt Peak || Spacewatch || — || align=right | 3.1 km || 
|-id=289 bgcolor=#fefefe
| 453289 ||  || — || October 6, 2008 || Catalina || CSS || — || align=right data-sort-value="0.79" | 790 m || 
|-id=290 bgcolor=#fefefe
| 453290 ||  || — || October 10, 2008 || Mount Lemmon || Mount Lemmon Survey || — || align=right data-sort-value="0.66" | 660 m || 
|-id=291 bgcolor=#fefefe
| 453291 ||  || — || October 2, 2008 || Kitt Peak || Spacewatch || — || align=right data-sort-value="0.49" | 490 m || 
|-id=292 bgcolor=#FA8072
| 453292 ||  || — || October 1, 2008 || Catalina || CSS || critical || align=right data-sort-value="0.78" | 780 m || 
|-id=293 bgcolor=#d6d6d6
| 453293 ||  || — || October 9, 2008 || Kitt Peak || Spacewatch || — || align=right | 3.5 km || 
|-id=294 bgcolor=#fefefe
| 453294 ||  || — || October 17, 2008 || Kitt Peak || Spacewatch || — || align=right data-sort-value="0.63" | 630 m || 
|-id=295 bgcolor=#fefefe
| 453295 ||  || — || September 22, 2008 || Kitt Peak || Spacewatch || — || align=right data-sort-value="0.70" | 700 m || 
|-id=296 bgcolor=#fefefe
| 453296 ||  || — || October 25, 2008 || Socorro || LINEAR || — || align=right data-sort-value="0.74" | 740 m || 
|-id=297 bgcolor=#fefefe
| 453297 ||  || — || October 20, 2008 || Kitt Peak || Spacewatch || — || align=right data-sort-value="0.53" | 530 m || 
|-id=298 bgcolor=#fefefe
| 453298 ||  || — || October 22, 2008 || Kitt Peak || Spacewatch || — || align=right data-sort-value="0.73" | 730 m || 
|-id=299 bgcolor=#fefefe
| 453299 ||  || — || October 23, 2008 || Kitt Peak || Spacewatch || — || align=right data-sort-value="0.86" | 860 m || 
|-id=300 bgcolor=#fefefe
| 453300 ||  || — || September 7, 2008 || Mount Lemmon || Mount Lemmon Survey || V || align=right data-sort-value="0.75" | 750 m || 
|}

453301–453400 

|-bgcolor=#fefefe
| 453301 ||  || — || October 27, 2008 || Mount Lemmon || Mount Lemmon Survey || — || align=right data-sort-value="0.94" | 940 m || 
|-id=302 bgcolor=#fefefe
| 453302 ||  || — || October 31, 2008 || Desert Moon || B. L. Stevens || — || align=right data-sort-value="0.52" | 520 m || 
|-id=303 bgcolor=#fefefe
| 453303 ||  || — || October 24, 2008 || Catalina || CSS || — || align=right data-sort-value="0.59" | 590 m || 
|-id=304 bgcolor=#fefefe
| 453304 ||  || — || October 25, 2008 || Kitt Peak || Spacewatch || — || align=right | 2.4 km || 
|-id=305 bgcolor=#fefefe
| 453305 ||  || — || October 28, 2008 || Mount Lemmon || Mount Lemmon Survey || — || align=right data-sort-value="0.56" | 560 m || 
|-id=306 bgcolor=#fefefe
| 453306 ||  || — || October 28, 2008 || Mount Lemmon || Mount Lemmon Survey || — || align=right data-sort-value="0.50" | 500 m || 
|-id=307 bgcolor=#fefefe
| 453307 ||  || — || October 20, 2008 || Kitt Peak || Spacewatch || — || align=right data-sort-value="0.68" | 680 m || 
|-id=308 bgcolor=#fefefe
| 453308 ||  || — || October 28, 2008 || Kitt Peak || Spacewatch || — || align=right data-sort-value="0.62" | 620 m || 
|-id=309 bgcolor=#FFC2E0
| 453309 ||  || — || November 4, 2008 || Socorro || LINEAR || AMOcritical || align=right data-sort-value="0.47" | 470 m || 
|-id=310 bgcolor=#fefefe
| 453310 ||  || — || November 1, 2008 || Kitt Peak || Spacewatch || — || align=right data-sort-value="0.69" | 690 m || 
|-id=311 bgcolor=#fefefe
| 453311 ||  || — || September 24, 2008 || Mount Lemmon || Mount Lemmon Survey || — || align=right data-sort-value="0.69" | 690 m || 
|-id=312 bgcolor=#fefefe
| 453312 ||  || — || October 21, 2008 || Kitt Peak || Spacewatch || — || align=right data-sort-value="0.76" | 760 m || 
|-id=313 bgcolor=#fefefe
| 453313 ||  || — || November 2, 2008 || Mount Lemmon || Mount Lemmon Survey || — || align=right data-sort-value="0.86" | 860 m || 
|-id=314 bgcolor=#fefefe
| 453314 ||  || — || October 29, 2008 || Kitt Peak || Spacewatch || NYS || align=right data-sort-value="0.52" | 520 m || 
|-id=315 bgcolor=#fefefe
| 453315 ||  || — || October 26, 2008 || Kitt Peak || Spacewatch || — || align=right data-sort-value="0.58" | 580 m || 
|-id=316 bgcolor=#fefefe
| 453316 ||  || — || October 26, 2008 || Kitt Peak || Spacewatch || — || align=right data-sort-value="0.70" | 700 m || 
|-id=317 bgcolor=#fefefe
| 453317 ||  || — || October 23, 2008 || Kitt Peak || Spacewatch || — || align=right data-sort-value="0.90" | 900 m || 
|-id=318 bgcolor=#fefefe
| 453318 ||  || — || November 8, 2008 || Kitt Peak || Spacewatch || — || align=right data-sort-value="0.54" | 540 m || 
|-id=319 bgcolor=#FA8072
| 453319 ||  || — || November 3, 2008 || Mount Lemmon || Mount Lemmon Survey || — || align=right data-sort-value="0.92" | 920 m || 
|-id=320 bgcolor=#fefefe
| 453320 ||  || — || November 18, 2008 || Catalina || CSS || NYS || align=right data-sort-value="0.51" | 510 m || 
|-id=321 bgcolor=#fefefe
| 453321 ||  || — || September 29, 2008 || Mount Lemmon || Mount Lemmon Survey || — || align=right data-sort-value="0.65" | 650 m || 
|-id=322 bgcolor=#fefefe
| 453322 ||  || — || November 17, 2008 || Kitt Peak || Spacewatch || — || align=right data-sort-value="0.54" | 540 m || 
|-id=323 bgcolor=#fefefe
| 453323 ||  || — || November 17, 2008 || Kitt Peak || Spacewatch || — || align=right data-sort-value="0.76" | 760 m || 
|-id=324 bgcolor=#fefefe
| 453324 ||  || — || September 29, 2008 || Mount Lemmon || Mount Lemmon Survey || V || align=right data-sort-value="0.68" | 680 m || 
|-id=325 bgcolor=#fefefe
| 453325 ||  || — || November 20, 2008 || Kitt Peak || Spacewatch || — || align=right data-sort-value="0.57" | 570 m || 
|-id=326 bgcolor=#fefefe
| 453326 ||  || — || November 24, 2008 || Mount Lemmon || Mount Lemmon Survey || — || align=right data-sort-value="0.71" | 710 m || 
|-id=327 bgcolor=#fefefe
| 453327 ||  || — || November 19, 2008 || Kitt Peak || Spacewatch || — || align=right data-sort-value="0.69" | 690 m || 
|-id=328 bgcolor=#fefefe
| 453328 ||  || — || December 1, 2008 || Kitt Peak || Spacewatch || — || align=right data-sort-value="0.72" | 720 m || 
|-id=329 bgcolor=#fefefe
| 453329 ||  || — || December 1, 2008 || Mount Lemmon || Mount Lemmon Survey || — || align=right data-sort-value="0.94" | 940 m || 
|-id=330 bgcolor=#fefefe
| 453330 ||  || — || December 1, 2008 || Kitt Peak || Spacewatch || — || align=right data-sort-value="0.96" | 960 m || 
|-id=331 bgcolor=#fefefe
| 453331 ||  || — || December 4, 2008 || Mount Lemmon || Mount Lemmon Survey || MAS || align=right data-sort-value="0.62" | 620 m || 
|-id=332 bgcolor=#fefefe
| 453332 ||  || — || December 21, 2008 || Mount Lemmon || Mount Lemmon Survey || — || align=right data-sort-value="0.80" | 800 m || 
|-id=333 bgcolor=#fefefe
| 453333 ||  || — || October 9, 2008 || Kitt Peak || Spacewatch || NYS || align=right data-sort-value="0.69" | 690 m || 
|-id=334 bgcolor=#fefefe
| 453334 ||  || — || December 22, 2008 || Kitt Peak || Spacewatch || — || align=right data-sort-value="0.62" | 620 m || 
|-id=335 bgcolor=#fefefe
| 453335 ||  || — || November 24, 2008 || Mount Lemmon || Mount Lemmon Survey || — || align=right data-sort-value="0.78" | 780 m || 
|-id=336 bgcolor=#fefefe
| 453336 ||  || — || December 29, 2008 || Mount Lemmon || Mount Lemmon Survey || V || align=right data-sort-value="0.51" | 510 m || 
|-id=337 bgcolor=#fefefe
| 453337 ||  || — || December 29, 2008 || Mount Lemmon || Mount Lemmon Survey || — || align=right data-sort-value="0.62" | 620 m || 
|-id=338 bgcolor=#fefefe
| 453338 ||  || — || December 30, 2008 || Kitt Peak || Spacewatch || — || align=right data-sort-value="0.48" | 480 m || 
|-id=339 bgcolor=#fefefe
| 453339 ||  || — || December 29, 2008 || Mount Lemmon || Mount Lemmon Survey || — || align=right | 2.1 km || 
|-id=340 bgcolor=#fefefe
| 453340 ||  || — || December 30, 2008 || Mount Lemmon || Mount Lemmon Survey || — || align=right data-sort-value="0.69" | 690 m || 
|-id=341 bgcolor=#fefefe
| 453341 ||  || — || December 21, 2008 || Kitt Peak || Spacewatch || — || align=right data-sort-value="0.82" | 820 m || 
|-id=342 bgcolor=#fefefe
| 453342 ||  || — || November 20, 2008 || Mount Lemmon || Mount Lemmon Survey || — || align=right data-sort-value="0.70" | 700 m || 
|-id=343 bgcolor=#fefefe
| 453343 ||  || — || December 29, 2008 || Kitt Peak || Spacewatch || — || align=right data-sort-value="0.77" | 770 m || 
|-id=344 bgcolor=#fefefe
| 453344 ||  || — || December 22, 2008 || Kitt Peak || Spacewatch || — || align=right data-sort-value="0.71" | 710 m || 
|-id=345 bgcolor=#fefefe
| 453345 ||  || — || December 29, 2008 || Kitt Peak || Spacewatch || V || align=right data-sort-value="0.66" | 660 m || 
|-id=346 bgcolor=#fefefe
| 453346 ||  || — || February 24, 2006 || Kitt Peak || Spacewatch || — || align=right data-sort-value="0.73" | 730 m || 
|-id=347 bgcolor=#fefefe
| 453347 ||  || — || December 30, 2008 || Kitt Peak || Spacewatch || — || align=right data-sort-value="0.64" | 640 m || 
|-id=348 bgcolor=#fefefe
| 453348 ||  || — || December 30, 2008 || Kitt Peak || Spacewatch || MAS || align=right data-sort-value="0.68" | 680 m || 
|-id=349 bgcolor=#fefefe
| 453349 ||  || — || December 30, 2008 || Kitt Peak || Spacewatch || — || align=right | 1.6 km || 
|-id=350 bgcolor=#fefefe
| 453350 ||  || — || November 30, 2008 || Mount Lemmon || Mount Lemmon Survey || NYS || align=right data-sort-value="0.63" | 630 m || 
|-id=351 bgcolor=#fefefe
| 453351 ||  || — || December 30, 2008 || Mount Lemmon || Mount Lemmon Survey || NYS || align=right data-sort-value="0.69" | 690 m || 
|-id=352 bgcolor=#E9E9E9
| 453352 ||  || — || December 31, 2008 || Catalina || CSS || EUN || align=right | 1.4 km || 
|-id=353 bgcolor=#fefefe
| 453353 ||  || — || December 21, 2008 || Kitt Peak || Spacewatch || — || align=right data-sort-value="0.71" | 710 m || 
|-id=354 bgcolor=#fefefe
| 453354 ||  || — || December 31, 2008 || Mount Lemmon || Mount Lemmon Survey || MAS || align=right data-sort-value="0.88" | 880 m || 
|-id=355 bgcolor=#fefefe
| 453355 ||  || — || April 24, 2006 || Kitt Peak || Spacewatch || — || align=right data-sort-value="0.66" | 660 m || 
|-id=356 bgcolor=#fefefe
| 453356 ||  || — || December 22, 2008 || Kitt Peak || Spacewatch || — || align=right data-sort-value="0.77" | 770 m || 
|-id=357 bgcolor=#fefefe
| 453357 ||  || — || January 2, 2009 || Mount Lemmon || Mount Lemmon Survey || — || align=right data-sort-value="0.57" | 570 m || 
|-id=358 bgcolor=#fefefe
| 453358 ||  || — || December 21, 2008 || Kitt Peak || Spacewatch || — || align=right data-sort-value="0.62" | 620 m || 
|-id=359 bgcolor=#fefefe
| 453359 ||  || — || December 22, 2008 || Kitt Peak || Spacewatch || — || align=right | 1.0 km || 
|-id=360 bgcolor=#fefefe
| 453360 ||  || — || January 15, 2009 || Kitt Peak || Spacewatch || — || align=right data-sort-value="0.75" | 750 m || 
|-id=361 bgcolor=#fefefe
| 453361 ||  || — || December 22, 2008 || Kitt Peak || Spacewatch || MAS || align=right data-sort-value="0.47" | 470 m || 
|-id=362 bgcolor=#fefefe
| 453362 ||  || — || December 5, 2008 || Mount Lemmon || Mount Lemmon Survey || — || align=right data-sort-value="0.73" | 730 m || 
|-id=363 bgcolor=#fefefe
| 453363 ||  || — || January 2, 2009 || Kitt Peak || Spacewatch || MAScritical || align=right data-sort-value="0.52" | 520 m || 
|-id=364 bgcolor=#fefefe
| 453364 ||  || — || January 17, 2009 || Kitt Peak || Spacewatch || — || align=right data-sort-value="0.94" | 940 m || 
|-id=365 bgcolor=#fefefe
| 453365 ||  || — || January 2, 2009 || Mount Lemmon || Mount Lemmon Survey || V || align=right data-sort-value="0.60" | 600 m || 
|-id=366 bgcolor=#fefefe
| 453366 ||  || — || January 2, 2009 || Mount Lemmon || Mount Lemmon Survey || — || align=right data-sort-value="0.71" | 710 m || 
|-id=367 bgcolor=#fefefe
| 453367 ||  || — || January 2, 2009 || Mount Lemmon || Mount Lemmon Survey || — || align=right data-sort-value="0.74" | 740 m || 
|-id=368 bgcolor=#fefefe
| 453368 ||  || — || January 16, 2009 || Kitt Peak || Spacewatch || — || align=right data-sort-value="0.84" | 840 m || 
|-id=369 bgcolor=#fefefe
| 453369 ||  || — || January 2, 2009 || Mount Lemmon || Mount Lemmon Survey || — || align=right data-sort-value="0.66" | 660 m || 
|-id=370 bgcolor=#fefefe
| 453370 ||  || — || January 16, 2009 || Mount Lemmon || Mount Lemmon Survey || — || align=right data-sort-value="0.69" | 690 m || 
|-id=371 bgcolor=#fefefe
| 453371 ||  || — || January 16, 2009 || Kitt Peak || Spacewatch || — || align=right data-sort-value="0.58" | 580 m || 
|-id=372 bgcolor=#fefefe
| 453372 ||  || — || January 20, 2009 || Kitt Peak || Spacewatch || NYS || align=right data-sort-value="0.62" | 620 m || 
|-id=373 bgcolor=#fefefe
| 453373 ||  || — || December 29, 2008 || Catalina || CSS || — || align=right | 2.7 km || 
|-id=374 bgcolor=#fefefe
| 453374 ||  || — || January 2, 2009 || Mount Lemmon || Mount Lemmon Survey || MAS || align=right data-sort-value="0.78" | 780 m || 
|-id=375 bgcolor=#fefefe
| 453375 ||  || — || January 25, 2009 || Kitt Peak || Spacewatch || — || align=right data-sort-value="0.94" | 940 m || 
|-id=376 bgcolor=#fefefe
| 453376 ||  || — || November 22, 2008 || Mount Lemmon || Mount Lemmon Survey || ERI || align=right | 1.5 km || 
|-id=377 bgcolor=#fefefe
| 453377 ||  || — || November 24, 2008 || Mount Lemmon || Mount Lemmon Survey || — || align=right data-sort-value="0.92" | 920 m || 
|-id=378 bgcolor=#fefefe
| 453378 ||  || — || January 29, 2009 || Mount Lemmon || Mount Lemmon Survey || CLA || align=right | 1.5 km || 
|-id=379 bgcolor=#E9E9E9
| 453379 ||  || — || January 31, 2009 || Kitt Peak || Spacewatch || EUN || align=right | 1.4 km || 
|-id=380 bgcolor=#fefefe
| 453380 ||  || — || January 31, 2009 || Kitt Peak || Spacewatch || NYS || align=right data-sort-value="0.58" | 580 m || 
|-id=381 bgcolor=#fefefe
| 453381 ||  || — || January 15, 2009 || Kitt Peak || Spacewatch || MAS || align=right data-sort-value="0.59" | 590 m || 
|-id=382 bgcolor=#fefefe
| 453382 ||  || — || January 29, 2009 || Kitt Peak || Spacewatch || MAS || align=right data-sort-value="0.54" | 540 m || 
|-id=383 bgcolor=#fefefe
| 453383 ||  || — || January 31, 2009 || Kitt Peak || Spacewatch || MAS || align=right data-sort-value="0.61" | 610 m || 
|-id=384 bgcolor=#fefefe
| 453384 ||  || — || January 25, 2009 || Kitt Peak || Spacewatch || MAS || align=right data-sort-value="0.61" | 610 m || 
|-id=385 bgcolor=#fefefe
| 453385 ||  || — || January 20, 2009 || Catalina || CSS || — || align=right data-sort-value="0.79" | 790 m || 
|-id=386 bgcolor=#fefefe
| 453386 ||  || — || October 27, 2005 || Catalina || CSS || H || align=right data-sort-value="0.83" | 830 m || 
|-id=387 bgcolor=#fefefe
| 453387 ||  || — || January 1, 2009 || Mount Lemmon || Mount Lemmon Survey || — || align=right data-sort-value="0.69" | 690 m || 
|-id=388 bgcolor=#fefefe
| 453388 ||  || — || January 17, 2009 || Kitt Peak || Spacewatch || MAS || align=right data-sort-value="0.70" | 700 m || 
|-id=389 bgcolor=#fefefe
| 453389 ||  || — || February 1, 2009 || Kitt Peak || Spacewatch || — || align=right data-sort-value="0.79" | 790 m || 
|-id=390 bgcolor=#fefefe
| 453390 ||  || — || February 1, 2009 || Kitt Peak || Spacewatch || NYS || align=right data-sort-value="0.54" | 540 m || 
|-id=391 bgcolor=#fefefe
| 453391 ||  || — || December 29, 2008 || Mount Lemmon || Mount Lemmon Survey || — || align=right data-sort-value="0.86" | 860 m || 
|-id=392 bgcolor=#E9E9E9
| 453392 ||  || — || February 14, 2009 || La Sagra || OAM Obs. || — || align=right | 2.0 km || 
|-id=393 bgcolor=#fefefe
| 453393 ||  || — || February 3, 2009 || Mount Lemmon || Mount Lemmon Survey || — || align=right data-sort-value="0.87" | 870 m || 
|-id=394 bgcolor=#fefefe
| 453394 ||  || — || February 14, 2009 || Kitt Peak || Spacewatch || — || align=right data-sort-value="0.80" | 800 m || 
|-id=395 bgcolor=#d6d6d6
| 453395 ||  || — || February 21, 2009 || Mount Lemmon || Mount Lemmon Survey || 3:2 || align=right | 5.0 km || 
|-id=396 bgcolor=#E9E9E9
| 453396 ||  || — || February 4, 2009 || Mount Lemmon || Mount Lemmon Survey || MAR || align=right data-sort-value="0.87" | 870 m || 
|-id=397 bgcolor=#fefefe
| 453397 ||  || — || February 20, 2009 || Kitt Peak || Spacewatch || — || align=right data-sort-value="0.70" | 700 m || 
|-id=398 bgcolor=#fefefe
| 453398 ||  || — || February 21, 2009 || Kitt Peak || Spacewatch || — || align=right data-sort-value="0.70" | 700 m || 
|-id=399 bgcolor=#E9E9E9
| 453399 ||  || — || February 26, 2009 || Catalina || CSS || — || align=right data-sort-value="0.78" | 780 m || 
|-id=400 bgcolor=#fefefe
| 453400 ||  || — || January 31, 2009 || Kitt Peak || Spacewatch || MAS || align=right data-sort-value="0.67" | 670 m || 
|}

453401–453500 

|-bgcolor=#fefefe
| 453401 ||  || — || February 18, 2009 || Socorro || LINEAR || — || align=right data-sort-value="0.68" | 680 m || 
|-id=402 bgcolor=#fefefe
| 453402 ||  || — || February 19, 2009 || Kitt Peak || Spacewatch || — || align=right data-sort-value="0.57" | 570 m || 
|-id=403 bgcolor=#fefefe
| 453403 ||  || — || March 15, 2009 || Kitt Peak || Spacewatch || NYS || align=right data-sort-value="0.65" | 650 m || 
|-id=404 bgcolor=#fefefe
| 453404 ||  || — || September 23, 2000 || Socorro || LINEAR || — || align=right data-sort-value="0.99" | 990 m || 
|-id=405 bgcolor=#fefefe
| 453405 ||  || — || March 17, 2009 || Catalina || CSS || — || align=right data-sort-value="0.86" | 860 m || 
|-id=406 bgcolor=#fefefe
| 453406 ||  || — || March 19, 2009 || Siding Spring || SSS || — || align=right | 1.4 km || 
|-id=407 bgcolor=#E9E9E9
| 453407 ||  || — || March 21, 2009 || Mount Lemmon || Mount Lemmon Survey || — || align=right | 1.1 km || 
|-id=408 bgcolor=#fefefe
| 453408 ||  || — || March 31, 2009 || Catalina || CSS || — || align=right data-sort-value="0.85" | 850 m || 
|-id=409 bgcolor=#E9E9E9
| 453409 ||  || — || March 19, 2009 || Kitt Peak || Spacewatch || — || align=right | 1.2 km || 
|-id=410 bgcolor=#E9E9E9
| 453410 ||  || — || April 1, 2009 || Catalina || CSS || — || align=right | 3.2 km || 
|-id=411 bgcolor=#fefefe
| 453411 ||  || — || February 23, 2009 || Siding Spring || SSS || — || align=right | 1.4 km || 
|-id=412 bgcolor=#E9E9E9
| 453412 ||  || — || April 1, 2009 || Kitt Peak || Spacewatch || — || align=right data-sort-value="0.89" | 890 m || 
|-id=413 bgcolor=#d6d6d6
| 453413 ||  || — || April 17, 2009 || Kitt Peak || Spacewatch || — || align=right | 3.3 km || 
|-id=414 bgcolor=#E9E9E9
| 453414 ||  || — || April 19, 2009 || Kitt Peak || Spacewatch || — || align=right | 2.7 km || 
|-id=415 bgcolor=#fefefe
| 453415 ||  || — || April 23, 2009 || La Sagra || OAM Obs. || — || align=right data-sort-value="0.81" | 810 m || 
|-id=416 bgcolor=#E9E9E9
| 453416 ||  || — || April 23, 2009 || Kitt Peak || Spacewatch || — || align=right | 1.6 km || 
|-id=417 bgcolor=#E9E9E9
| 453417 ||  || — || April 22, 2009 || Mount Lemmon || Mount Lemmon Survey || EUN || align=right data-sort-value="0.88" | 880 m || 
|-id=418 bgcolor=#E9E9E9
| 453418 ||  || — || April 24, 2009 || Mount Lemmon || Mount Lemmon Survey || — || align=right data-sort-value="0.72" | 720 m || 
|-id=419 bgcolor=#fefefe
| 453419 ||  || — || April 28, 2009 || Catalina || CSS || — || align=right data-sort-value="0.75" | 750 m || 
|-id=420 bgcolor=#E9E9E9
| 453420 ||  || — || April 23, 2009 || Catalina || CSS || — || align=right | 3.3 km || 
|-id=421 bgcolor=#E9E9E9
| 453421 ||  || — || April 23, 2009 || Kitt Peak || Spacewatch || — || align=right | 1.7 km || 
|-id=422 bgcolor=#E9E9E9
| 453422 ||  || — || February 20, 2009 || Mount Lemmon || Mount Lemmon Survey || — || align=right | 1.0 km || 
|-id=423 bgcolor=#E9E9E9
| 453423 ||  || — || May 13, 2009 || Mount Lemmon || Mount Lemmon Survey || — || align=right | 1.7 km || 
|-id=424 bgcolor=#E9E9E9
| 453424 ||  || — || May 13, 2009 || Kitt Peak || Spacewatch || — || align=right | 1.4 km || 
|-id=425 bgcolor=#E9E9E9
| 453425 ||  || — || May 15, 2009 || Kitt Peak || Spacewatch || — || align=right | 1.2 km || 
|-id=426 bgcolor=#E9E9E9
| 453426 ||  || — || May 1, 2009 || Cerro Burek || Alianza S4 Obs. || — || align=right | 1.4 km || 
|-id=427 bgcolor=#E9E9E9
| 453427 ||  || — || April 20, 2009 || Kitt Peak || Spacewatch || — || align=right | 1.8 km || 
|-id=428 bgcolor=#E9E9E9
| 453428 ||  || — || May 16, 2009 || Catalina || CSS || — || align=right | 3.7 km || 
|-id=429 bgcolor=#E9E9E9
| 453429 ||  || — || May 17, 2009 || Mount Lemmon || Mount Lemmon Survey || — || align=right | 2.4 km || 
|-id=430 bgcolor=#d6d6d6
| 453430 ||  || — || August 2, 2009 || Siding Spring || SSS || — || align=right | 3.0 km || 
|-id=431 bgcolor=#fefefe
| 453431 ||  || — || June 23, 2009 || Mount Lemmon || Mount Lemmon Survey || H || align=right data-sort-value="0.69" | 690 m || 
|-id=432 bgcolor=#d6d6d6
| 453432 ||  || — || February 25, 2007 || Mount Lemmon || Mount Lemmon Survey || — || align=right | 3.8 km || 
|-id=433 bgcolor=#d6d6d6
| 453433 ||  || — || August 15, 2009 || Catalina || CSS || — || align=right | 3.6 km || 
|-id=434 bgcolor=#fefefe
| 453434 ||  || — || January 12, 2008 || Catalina || CSS || H || align=right data-sort-value="0.89" | 890 m || 
|-id=435 bgcolor=#d6d6d6
| 453435 ||  || — || August 16, 2009 || Kitt Peak || Spacewatch || — || align=right | 3.6 km || 
|-id=436 bgcolor=#d6d6d6
| 453436 ||  || — || August 16, 2009 || Kitt Peak || Spacewatch || — || align=right | 2.6 km || 
|-id=437 bgcolor=#d6d6d6
| 453437 ||  || — || August 23, 2009 || Bergisch Gladbach || W. Bickel || VER || align=right | 2.7 km || 
|-id=438 bgcolor=#d6d6d6
| 453438 ||  || — || August 21, 2009 || Socorro || LINEAR || — || align=right | 2.8 km || 
|-id=439 bgcolor=#d6d6d6
| 453439 ||  || — || August 27, 2009 || Kitt Peak || Spacewatch || — || align=right | 2.0 km || 
|-id=440 bgcolor=#d6d6d6
| 453440 ||  || — || October 15, 2004 || Mount Lemmon || Mount Lemmon Survey || THM || align=right | 2.7 km || 
|-id=441 bgcolor=#d6d6d6
| 453441 ||  || — || August 16, 2009 || Kitt Peak || Spacewatch || — || align=right | 2.6 km || 
|-id=442 bgcolor=#d6d6d6
| 453442 ||  || — || August 16, 2009 || Kitt Peak || Spacewatch || EOS || align=right | 1.7 km || 
|-id=443 bgcolor=#d6d6d6
| 453443 ||  || — || August 20, 2009 || Kitt Peak || Spacewatch || THM || align=right | 1.8 km || 
|-id=444 bgcolor=#d6d6d6
| 453444 ||  || — || August 18, 2009 || Kitt Peak || Spacewatch || — || align=right | 2.2 km || 
|-id=445 bgcolor=#d6d6d6
| 453445 ||  || — || August 17, 2009 || Socorro || LINEAR || Tj (2.99) || align=right | 4.8 km || 
|-id=446 bgcolor=#d6d6d6
| 453446 ||  || — || September 12, 2009 || Kitt Peak || Spacewatch || — || align=right | 2.3 km || 
|-id=447 bgcolor=#d6d6d6
| 453447 ||  || — || September 12, 2009 || Kitt Peak || Spacewatch || THM || align=right | 1.9 km || 
|-id=448 bgcolor=#d6d6d6
| 453448 ||  || — || September 12, 2009 || Kitt Peak || Spacewatch || — || align=right | 2.7 km || 
|-id=449 bgcolor=#d6d6d6
| 453449 ||  || — || September 12, 2009 || Kitt Peak || Spacewatch || — || align=right | 3.1 km || 
|-id=450 bgcolor=#d6d6d6
| 453450 ||  || — || August 26, 2009 || Socorro || LINEAR || — || align=right | 3.3 km || 
|-id=451 bgcolor=#d6d6d6
| 453451 ||  || — || September 15, 2009 || Kitt Peak || Spacewatch || — || align=right | 2.9 km || 
|-id=452 bgcolor=#d6d6d6
| 453452 ||  || — || September 15, 2009 || Kitt Peak || Spacewatch || — || align=right | 2.9 km || 
|-id=453 bgcolor=#d6d6d6
| 453453 ||  || — || September 12, 2009 || Kitt Peak || Spacewatch || THM || align=right | 1.8 km || 
|-id=454 bgcolor=#d6d6d6
| 453454 ||  || — || September 15, 2009 || Catalina || CSS || — || align=right | 2.6 km || 
|-id=455 bgcolor=#d6d6d6
| 453455 ||  || — || August 28, 2009 || Kitt Peak || Spacewatch || — || align=right | 2.3 km || 
|-id=456 bgcolor=#d6d6d6
| 453456 ||  || — || September 16, 2009 || Kitt Peak || Spacewatch || — || align=right | 2.2 km || 
|-id=457 bgcolor=#d6d6d6
| 453457 ||  || — || September 16, 2009 || Kitt Peak || Spacewatch || — || align=right | 2.7 km || 
|-id=458 bgcolor=#d6d6d6
| 453458 ||  || — || September 17, 2009 || Kitt Peak || Spacewatch || VER || align=right | 3.4 km || 
|-id=459 bgcolor=#d6d6d6
| 453459 ||  || — || July 3, 2003 || Kitt Peak || Spacewatch || — || align=right | 2.3 km || 
|-id=460 bgcolor=#d6d6d6
| 453460 ||  || — || September 18, 2009 || Mount Lemmon || Mount Lemmon Survey || — || align=right | 2.4 km || 
|-id=461 bgcolor=#d6d6d6
| 453461 ||  || — || August 16, 2009 || Catalina || CSS || — || align=right | 4.3 km || 
|-id=462 bgcolor=#d6d6d6
| 453462 ||  || — || September 17, 2009 || Mount Lemmon || Mount Lemmon Survey || — || align=right | 3.1 km || 
|-id=463 bgcolor=#d6d6d6
| 453463 ||  || — || September 18, 2009 || Kitt Peak || Spacewatch || — || align=right | 2.0 km || 
|-id=464 bgcolor=#d6d6d6
| 453464 ||  || — || September 18, 2009 || Kitt Peak || Spacewatch || — || align=right | 2.4 km || 
|-id=465 bgcolor=#d6d6d6
| 453465 ||  || — || August 26, 2009 || Socorro || LINEAR || — || align=right | 2.4 km || 
|-id=466 bgcolor=#E9E9E9
| 453466 ||  || — || September 18, 2009 || Kitt Peak || Spacewatch || — || align=right | 2.2 km || 
|-id=467 bgcolor=#d6d6d6
| 453467 ||  || — || September 19, 2009 || Kitt Peak || Spacewatch || — || align=right | 1.8 km || 
|-id=468 bgcolor=#d6d6d6
| 453468 ||  || — || September 16, 2009 || Kitt Peak || Spacewatch || — || align=right | 2.4 km || 
|-id=469 bgcolor=#d6d6d6
| 453469 ||  || — || October 4, 2004 || Kitt Peak || Spacewatch || — || align=right | 2.4 km || 
|-id=470 bgcolor=#d6d6d6
| 453470 ||  || — || August 17, 2009 || Kitt Peak || Spacewatch || — || align=right | 2.9 km || 
|-id=471 bgcolor=#d6d6d6
| 453471 ||  || — || September 17, 2009 || Kitt Peak || Spacewatch || — || align=right | 2.9 km || 
|-id=472 bgcolor=#d6d6d6
| 453472 ||  || — || September 22, 2009 || Kitt Peak || Spacewatch || EOS || align=right | 1.5 km || 
|-id=473 bgcolor=#d6d6d6
| 453473 ||  || — || September 15, 2009 || Kitt Peak || Spacewatch || — || align=right | 2.0 km || 
|-id=474 bgcolor=#d6d6d6
| 453474 ||  || — || September 15, 2009 || Kitt Peak || Spacewatch || — || align=right | 3.3 km || 
|-id=475 bgcolor=#d6d6d6
| 453475 ||  || — || September 23, 2009 || Kitt Peak || Spacewatch || — || align=right | 2.3 km || 
|-id=476 bgcolor=#d6d6d6
| 453476 ||  || — || September 23, 2009 || Kitt Peak || Spacewatch || — || align=right | 2.7 km || 
|-id=477 bgcolor=#d6d6d6
| 453477 ||  || — || September 15, 2009 || Kitt Peak || Spacewatch || — || align=right | 2.3 km || 
|-id=478 bgcolor=#d6d6d6
| 453478 ||  || — || September 25, 2009 || La Sagra || OAM Obs. || — || align=right | 3.5 km || 
|-id=479 bgcolor=#d6d6d6
| 453479 ||  || — || September 30, 2009 || Mount Lemmon || Mount Lemmon Survey || Tj (2.97) || align=right | 5.1 km || 
|-id=480 bgcolor=#d6d6d6
| 453480 ||  || — || September 29, 2009 || Skylive Obs. || F. Tozzi || — || align=right | 3.9 km || 
|-id=481 bgcolor=#d6d6d6
| 453481 ||  || — || September 18, 2009 || Kitt Peak || Spacewatch || HYG || align=right | 3.1 km || 
|-id=482 bgcolor=#d6d6d6
| 453482 ||  || — || September 18, 2009 || Kitt Peak || Spacewatch || — || align=right | 2.9 km || 
|-id=483 bgcolor=#d6d6d6
| 453483 ||  || — || September 21, 2009 || Mount Lemmon || Mount Lemmon Survey || — || align=right | 2.6 km || 
|-id=484 bgcolor=#d6d6d6
| 453484 ||  || — || September 25, 2009 || Kitt Peak || Spacewatch || THM || align=right | 1.8 km || 
|-id=485 bgcolor=#d6d6d6
| 453485 ||  || — || September 21, 2009 || Kitt Peak || Spacewatch || EOS || align=right | 2.6 km || 
|-id=486 bgcolor=#d6d6d6
| 453486 ||  || — || September 25, 2009 || Kitt Peak || Spacewatch || — || align=right | 3.1 km || 
|-id=487 bgcolor=#d6d6d6
| 453487 ||  || — || September 17, 2009 || Kitt Peak || Spacewatch || — || align=right | 2.1 km || 
|-id=488 bgcolor=#d6d6d6
| 453488 ||  || — || September 26, 2009 || Kitt Peak || Spacewatch || — || align=right | 2.4 km || 
|-id=489 bgcolor=#d6d6d6
| 453489 ||  || — || August 18, 2009 || Catalina || CSS || — || align=right | 2.9 km || 
|-id=490 bgcolor=#d6d6d6
| 453490 ||  || — || September 18, 2009 || Mount Lemmon || Mount Lemmon Survey || — || align=right | 2.0 km || 
|-id=491 bgcolor=#d6d6d6
| 453491 ||  || — || September 26, 2009 || Kitt Peak || Spacewatch || — || align=right | 2.3 km || 
|-id=492 bgcolor=#d6d6d6
| 453492 ||  || — || September 24, 2009 || Mount Lemmon || Mount Lemmon Survey || — || align=right | 3.8 km || 
|-id=493 bgcolor=#d6d6d6
| 453493 ||  || — || September 16, 2009 || Kitt Peak || Spacewatch || EOS || align=right | 1.7 km || 
|-id=494 bgcolor=#d6d6d6
| 453494 ||  || — || September 16, 2009 || Mount Lemmon || Mount Lemmon Survey || — || align=right | 2.4 km || 
|-id=495 bgcolor=#d6d6d6
| 453495 ||  || — || September 17, 2009 || Kitt Peak || Spacewatch || — || align=right | 2.3 km || 
|-id=496 bgcolor=#d6d6d6
| 453496 ||  || — || September 26, 2009 || Kitt Peak || Spacewatch || — || align=right | 2.5 km || 
|-id=497 bgcolor=#d6d6d6
| 453497 ||  || — || September 28, 2009 || Mount Lemmon || Mount Lemmon Survey || — || align=right | 2.8 km || 
|-id=498 bgcolor=#d6d6d6
| 453498 ||  || — || September 26, 2009 || Catalina || CSS || — || align=right | 4.8 km || 
|-id=499 bgcolor=#d6d6d6
| 453499 ||  || — || September 26, 2009 || Kitt Peak || Spacewatch || — || align=right | 2.3 km || 
|-id=500 bgcolor=#d6d6d6
| 453500 ||  || — || October 9, 2009 || Catalina || CSS || TIR || align=right | 2.8 km || 
|}

453501–453600 

|-bgcolor=#d6d6d6
| 453501 ||  || — || September 29, 2009 || Mount Lemmon || Mount Lemmon Survey || — || align=right | 4.0 km || 
|-id=502 bgcolor=#d6d6d6
| 453502 ||  || — || October 16, 2009 || Socorro || LINEAR || — || align=right | 2.4 km || 
|-id=503 bgcolor=#d6d6d6
| 453503 ||  || — || September 15, 2009 || Kitt Peak || Spacewatch || critical || align=right | 2.0 km || 
|-id=504 bgcolor=#d6d6d6
| 453504 ||  || — || September 25, 2009 || Kitt Peak || Spacewatch || — || align=right | 2.5 km || 
|-id=505 bgcolor=#d6d6d6
| 453505 ||  || — || October 23, 2009 || Kitt Peak || Spacewatch || — || align=right | 2.8 km || 
|-id=506 bgcolor=#d6d6d6
| 453506 ||  || — || October 23, 2009 || Mount Lemmon || Mount Lemmon Survey || — || align=right | 3.0 km || 
|-id=507 bgcolor=#d6d6d6
| 453507 ||  || — || October 23, 2009 || Mount Lemmon || Mount Lemmon Survey || HYG || align=right | 2.2 km || 
|-id=508 bgcolor=#d6d6d6
| 453508 ||  || — || September 22, 2009 || Mount Lemmon || Mount Lemmon Survey || — || align=right | 2.8 km || 
|-id=509 bgcolor=#d6d6d6
| 453509 ||  || — || October 23, 2009 || Mount Lemmon || Mount Lemmon Survey || — || align=right | 4.2 km || 
|-id=510 bgcolor=#d6d6d6
| 453510 ||  || — || September 29, 2009 || Mount Lemmon || Mount Lemmon Survey || — || align=right | 2.4 km || 
|-id=511 bgcolor=#d6d6d6
| 453511 ||  || — || October 22, 2009 || Mount Lemmon || Mount Lemmon Survey || THM || align=right | 2.2 km || 
|-id=512 bgcolor=#d6d6d6
| 453512 ||  || — || October 23, 2009 || Kitt Peak || Spacewatch || LIX || align=right | 3.3 km || 
|-id=513 bgcolor=#d6d6d6
| 453513 ||  || — || March 24, 2006 || Kitt Peak || Spacewatch || — || align=right | 2.5 km || 
|-id=514 bgcolor=#d6d6d6
| 453514 ||  || — || October 14, 2009 || Mount Lemmon || Mount Lemmon Survey || THM || align=right | 1.8 km || 
|-id=515 bgcolor=#d6d6d6
| 453515 ||  || — || October 26, 2009 || Mount Lemmon || Mount Lemmon Survey || 7:4 || align=right | 4.6 km || 
|-id=516 bgcolor=#d6d6d6
| 453516 ||  || — || October 29, 2009 || La Sagra || OAM Obs. || — || align=right | 3.1 km || 
|-id=517 bgcolor=#d6d6d6
| 453517 ||  || — || October 16, 2009 || Catalina || CSS || Tj (2.99) || align=right | 4.0 km || 
|-id=518 bgcolor=#d6d6d6
| 453518 ||  || — || October 18, 2009 || Mount Lemmon || Mount Lemmon Survey || critical || align=right | 2.2 km || 
|-id=519 bgcolor=#d6d6d6
| 453519 ||  || — || October 25, 2009 || Kitt Peak || Spacewatch || — || align=right | 3.1 km || 
|-id=520 bgcolor=#d6d6d6
| 453520 ||  || — || October 23, 2009 || Mount Lemmon || Mount Lemmon Survey || — || align=right | 3.4 km || 
|-id=521 bgcolor=#d6d6d6
| 453521 ||  || — || November 9, 2009 || Socorro || LINEAR || — || align=right | 3.1 km || 
|-id=522 bgcolor=#d6d6d6
| 453522 ||  || — || November 8, 2009 || Catalina || CSS || TIR || align=right | 3.2 km || 
|-id=523 bgcolor=#d6d6d6
| 453523 ||  || — || November 8, 2009 || Mount Lemmon || Mount Lemmon Survey || — || align=right | 2.1 km || 
|-id=524 bgcolor=#d6d6d6
| 453524 ||  || — || September 21, 2009 || Mount Lemmon || Mount Lemmon Survey || EOS || align=right | 2.2 km || 
|-id=525 bgcolor=#d6d6d6
| 453525 ||  || — || November 10, 2009 || Kitt Peak || Spacewatch || — || align=right | 3.1 km || 
|-id=526 bgcolor=#d6d6d6
| 453526 ||  || — || September 15, 2009 || Kitt Peak || Spacewatch || THM || align=right | 2.4 km || 
|-id=527 bgcolor=#d6d6d6
| 453527 ||  || — || October 23, 2009 || Mount Lemmon || Mount Lemmon Survey || — || align=right | 2.9 km || 
|-id=528 bgcolor=#d6d6d6
| 453528 ||  || — || November 9, 2009 || Kitt Peak || Spacewatch || — || align=right | 2.9 km || 
|-id=529 bgcolor=#d6d6d6
| 453529 ||  || — || September 16, 2009 || Kitt Peak || Spacewatch || — || align=right | 2.2 km || 
|-id=530 bgcolor=#d6d6d6
| 453530 ||  || — || September 27, 2009 || Kitt Peak || Spacewatch || — || align=right | 2.3 km || 
|-id=531 bgcolor=#d6d6d6
| 453531 ||  || — || November 16, 2009 || Mount Lemmon || Mount Lemmon Survey || — || align=right | 3.9 km || 
|-id=532 bgcolor=#d6d6d6
| 453532 ||  || — || November 16, 2009 || Mount Lemmon || Mount Lemmon Survey || — || align=right | 3.1 km || 
|-id=533 bgcolor=#d6d6d6
| 453533 ||  || — || November 9, 2009 || Kitt Peak || Spacewatch || — || align=right | 3.5 km || 
|-id=534 bgcolor=#d6d6d6
| 453534 ||  || — || November 16, 2009 || Mount Lemmon || Mount Lemmon Survey || (3460) || align=right | 2.5 km || 
|-id=535 bgcolor=#d6d6d6
| 453535 ||  || — || November 16, 2009 || Mount Lemmon || Mount Lemmon Survey || VER || align=right | 3.9 km || 
|-id=536 bgcolor=#d6d6d6
| 453536 ||  || — || February 25, 2006 || Anderson Mesa || LONEOS || — || align=right | 4.4 km || 
|-id=537 bgcolor=#d6d6d6
| 453537 ||  || — || November 19, 2009 || Kitt Peak || Spacewatch || — || align=right | 3.8 km || 
|-id=538 bgcolor=#d6d6d6
| 453538 ||  || — || October 24, 2009 || Kitt Peak || Spacewatch || — || align=right | 2.5 km || 
|-id=539 bgcolor=#d6d6d6
| 453539 ||  || — || August 21, 2008 || Kitt Peak || Spacewatch || VER || align=right | 2.4 km || 
|-id=540 bgcolor=#d6d6d6
| 453540 ||  || — || November 8, 2009 || Kitt Peak || Spacewatch || — || align=right | 2.8 km || 
|-id=541 bgcolor=#d6d6d6
| 453541 ||  || — || October 21, 2009 || Catalina || CSS ||  || align=right | 3.3 km || 
|-id=542 bgcolor=#d6d6d6
| 453542 ||  || — || December 18, 2004 || Mount Lemmon || Mount Lemmon Survey || — || align=right | 3.2 km || 
|-id=543 bgcolor=#d6d6d6
| 453543 ||  || — || March 9, 2005 || Catalina || CSS || — || align=right | 3.0 km || 
|-id=544 bgcolor=#d6d6d6
| 453544 ||  || — || November 23, 2009 || Mount Lemmon || Mount Lemmon Survey || — || align=right | 2.8 km || 
|-id=545 bgcolor=#d6d6d6
| 453545 ||  || — || October 12, 2009 || Mount Lemmon || Mount Lemmon Survey || — || align=right | 3.8 km || 
|-id=546 bgcolor=#d6d6d6
| 453546 ||  || — || November 23, 2009 || Mount Lemmon || Mount Lemmon Survey || — || align=right | 5.3 km || 
|-id=547 bgcolor=#d6d6d6
| 453547 ||  || — || September 24, 2009 || Catalina || CSS || — || align=right | 4.7 km || 
|-id=548 bgcolor=#d6d6d6
| 453548 ||  || — || November 24, 2009 || Mount Lemmon || Mount Lemmon Survey || VER || align=right | 2.2 km || 
|-id=549 bgcolor=#d6d6d6
| 453549 ||  || — || October 24, 2009 || Kitt Peak || Spacewatch || — || align=right | 3.0 km || 
|-id=550 bgcolor=#d6d6d6
| 453550 ||  || — || October 29, 2009 || Catalina || CSS || — || align=right | 2.2 km || 
|-id=551 bgcolor=#d6d6d6
| 453551 ||  || — || September 18, 2009 || Mount Lemmon || Mount Lemmon Survey || — || align=right | 2.9 km || 
|-id=552 bgcolor=#d6d6d6
| 453552 ||  || — || November 19, 2009 || Kitt Peak || Spacewatch || Tj (2.97) || align=right | 4.2 km || 
|-id=553 bgcolor=#d6d6d6
| 453553 ||  || — || November 27, 2009 || Mount Lemmon || Mount Lemmon Survey || — || align=right | 3.3 km || 
|-id=554 bgcolor=#d6d6d6
| 453554 ||  || — || December 13, 2009 || Socorro || LINEAR || — || align=right | 3.9 km || 
|-id=555 bgcolor=#d6d6d6
| 453555 ||  || — || December 17, 2009 || Mount Lemmon || Mount Lemmon Survey || — || align=right | 5.1 km || 
|-id=556 bgcolor=#d6d6d6
| 453556 ||  || — || December 16, 2009 || Kitt Peak || Spacewatch || — || align=right | 2.9 km || 
|-id=557 bgcolor=#d6d6d6
| 453557 ||  || — || December 26, 2009 || Kitt Peak || Spacewatch || — || align=right | 3.5 km || 
|-id=558 bgcolor=#d6d6d6
| 453558 ||  || — || November 9, 2009 || Kitt Peak || Spacewatch || THB || align=right | 3.7 km || 
|-id=559 bgcolor=#d6d6d6
| 453559 ||  || — || January 6, 2010 || Catalina || CSS || — || align=right | 4.5 km || 
|-id=560 bgcolor=#d6d6d6
| 453560 ||  || — || November 18, 2009 || Kitt Peak || Spacewatch || — || align=right | 5.3 km || 
|-id=561 bgcolor=#d6d6d6
| 453561 ||  || — || January 6, 2010 || Kitt Peak || Spacewatch || — || align=right | 3.9 km || 
|-id=562 bgcolor=#d6d6d6
| 453562 ||  || — || September 19, 2009 || Kitt Peak || Spacewatch || — || align=right | 2.4 km || 
|-id=563 bgcolor=#FFC2E0
| 453563 ||  || — || January 16, 2010 || Mount Lemmon || Mount Lemmon Survey || ATEPHA || align=right data-sort-value="0.32" | 320 m || 
|-id=564 bgcolor=#d6d6d6
| 453564 ||  || — || October 15, 2009 || Catalina || CSS || Tj (2.99) || align=right | 5.1 km || 
|-id=565 bgcolor=#d6d6d6
| 453565 ||  || — || October 1, 2009 || Mount Lemmon || Mount Lemmon Survey || — || align=right | 3.9 km || 
|-id=566 bgcolor=#fefefe
| 453566 ||  || — || February 5, 2010 || Kitt Peak || Spacewatch || — || align=right data-sort-value="0.57" | 570 m || 
|-id=567 bgcolor=#fefefe
| 453567 ||  || — || March 10, 2000 || Kitt Peak || Spacewatch || — || align=right data-sort-value="0.68" | 680 m || 
|-id=568 bgcolor=#fefefe
| 453568 ||  || — || February 14, 2010 || Mount Lemmon || Mount Lemmon Survey || — || align=right data-sort-value="0.62" | 620 m || 
|-id=569 bgcolor=#fefefe
| 453569 ||  || — || February 6, 2010 || Mount Lemmon || Mount Lemmon Survey || — || align=right data-sort-value="0.59" | 590 m || 
|-id=570 bgcolor=#fefefe
| 453570 ||  || — || January 12, 2010 || Mount Lemmon || Mount Lemmon Survey || — || align=right | 1.2 km || 
|-id=571 bgcolor=#d6d6d6
| 453571 ||  || — || December 11, 2009 || Mount Lemmon || Mount Lemmon Survey || — || align=right | 4.1 km || 
|-id=572 bgcolor=#fefefe
| 453572 ||  || — || February 9, 2010 || Kitt Peak || Spacewatch || — || align=right data-sort-value="0.81" | 810 m || 
|-id=573 bgcolor=#fefefe
| 453573 ||  || — || March 19, 2010 || Desert Moon || B. L. Stevens || — || align=right data-sort-value="0.85" | 850 m || 
|-id=574 bgcolor=#fefefe
| 453574 ||  || — || March 22, 2010 || Sierra Stars || Sierra Stars Obs. || — || align=right | 2.2 km || 
|-id=575 bgcolor=#fefefe
| 453575 ||  || — || March 26, 2010 || Kitt Peak || Spacewatch || — || align=right data-sort-value="0.73" | 730 m || 
|-id=576 bgcolor=#fefefe
| 453576 ||  || — || March 12, 2010 || Kitt Peak || Spacewatch || — || align=right data-sort-value="0.68" | 680 m || 
|-id=577 bgcolor=#fefefe
| 453577 ||  || — || March 16, 2010 || Mount Lemmon || Mount Lemmon Survey || — || align=right data-sort-value="0.74" | 740 m || 
|-id=578 bgcolor=#fefefe
| 453578 ||  || — || September 5, 2007 || Catalina || CSS || — || align=right data-sort-value="0.96" | 960 m || 
|-id=579 bgcolor=#fefefe
| 453579 ||  || — || October 6, 2004 || Kitt Peak || Spacewatch || — || align=right data-sort-value="0.82" | 820 m || 
|-id=580 bgcolor=#E9E9E9
| 453580 ||  || — || April 21, 2010 || WISE || WISE || — || align=right | 2.1 km || 
|-id=581 bgcolor=#d6d6d6
| 453581 ||  || — || March 3, 2005 || Kitt Peak || Spacewatch || — || align=right | 2.8 km || 
|-id=582 bgcolor=#E9E9E9
| 453582 ||  || — || April 26, 2010 || WISE || WISE || — || align=right | 2.3 km || 
|-id=583 bgcolor=#E9E9E9
| 453583 ||  || — || April 27, 2010 || WISE || WISE || — || align=right | 3.8 km || 
|-id=584 bgcolor=#fefefe
| 453584 ||  || — || March 12, 2010 || Kitt Peak || Spacewatch || ERI || align=right | 1.3 km || 
|-id=585 bgcolor=#E9E9E9
| 453585 ||  || — || April 30, 2010 || WISE || WISE || — || align=right | 1.9 km || 
|-id=586 bgcolor=#fefefe
| 453586 ||  || — || April 15, 2010 || Kitt Peak || Spacewatch || — || align=right data-sort-value="0.75" | 750 m || 
|-id=587 bgcolor=#E9E9E9
| 453587 ||  || — || May 10, 2010 || WISE || WISE || — || align=right | 2.9 km || 
|-id=588 bgcolor=#E9E9E9
| 453588 ||  || — || May 10, 2010 || WISE || WISE || — || align=right | 2.1 km || 
|-id=589 bgcolor=#fefefe
| 453589 ||  || — || May 11, 2010 || Mount Lemmon || Mount Lemmon Survey || NYS || align=right data-sort-value="0.62" | 620 m || 
|-id=590 bgcolor=#E9E9E9
| 453590 ||  || — || May 13, 2010 || WISE || WISE || — || align=right | 2.8 km || 
|-id=591 bgcolor=#fefefe
| 453591 ||  || — || September 7, 2004 || Kitt Peak || Spacewatch || — || align=right | 1.7 km || 
|-id=592 bgcolor=#E9E9E9
| 453592 ||  || — || May 20, 2010 || WISE || WISE || EUN || align=right | 1.7 km || 
|-id=593 bgcolor=#fefefe
| 453593 ||  || — || June 2, 2010 || Kitt Peak || Spacewatch || — || align=right data-sort-value="0.98" | 980 m || 
|-id=594 bgcolor=#E9E9E9
| 453594 ||  || — || June 8, 2010 || WISE || WISE || — || align=right | 1.8 km || 
|-id=595 bgcolor=#E9E9E9
| 453595 ||  || — || June 10, 2010 || WISE || WISE || — || align=right | 1.6 km || 
|-id=596 bgcolor=#E9E9E9
| 453596 ||  || — || June 13, 2010 || WISE || WISE || — || align=right | 2.4 km || 
|-id=597 bgcolor=#E9E9E9
| 453597 ||  || — || June 16, 2010 || WISE || WISE || DOR || align=right | 2.8 km || 
|-id=598 bgcolor=#E9E9E9
| 453598 ||  || — || June 27, 2010 || WISE || WISE || — || align=right | 3.0 km || 
|-id=599 bgcolor=#E9E9E9
| 453599 ||  || — || June 29, 2010 || WISE || WISE || — || align=right | 2.2 km || 
|-id=600 bgcolor=#E9E9E9
| 453600 ||  || — || June 30, 2010 || WISE || WISE || — || align=right | 2.7 km || 
|}

453601–453700 

|-bgcolor=#E9E9E9
| 453601 ||  || — || July 4, 2010 || Mount Lemmon || Mount Lemmon Survey || — || align=right | 1.9 km || 
|-id=602 bgcolor=#E9E9E9
| 453602 ||  || — || March 11, 2007 || Mount Lemmon || Mount Lemmon Survey || — || align=right | 3.9 km || 
|-id=603 bgcolor=#E9E9E9
| 453603 ||  || — || July 4, 2010 || Kitt Peak || Spacewatch || — || align=right | 1.9 km || 
|-id=604 bgcolor=#E9E9E9
| 453604 ||  || — || July 4, 2010 || Kitt Peak || Spacewatch || EUN || align=right | 1.2 km || 
|-id=605 bgcolor=#E9E9E9
| 453605 ||  || — || July 5, 2010 || Kitt Peak || Spacewatch || — || align=right | 1.1 km || 
|-id=606 bgcolor=#E9E9E9
| 453606 ||  || — || July 1, 2010 || WISE || WISE || — || align=right | 2.4 km || 
|-id=607 bgcolor=#E9E9E9
| 453607 ||  || — || July 6, 2010 || WISE || WISE || HOF || align=right | 2.3 km || 
|-id=608 bgcolor=#d6d6d6
| 453608 ||  || — || November 6, 2005 || Kitt Peak || Spacewatch || — || align=right | 3.5 km || 
|-id=609 bgcolor=#E9E9E9
| 453609 ||  || — || July 13, 2010 || WISE || WISE || — || align=right | 2.2 km || 
|-id=610 bgcolor=#E9E9E9
| 453610 ||  || — || July 23, 2010 || WISE || WISE || — || align=right | 3.9 km || 
|-id=611 bgcolor=#E9E9E9
| 453611 ||  || — || July 23, 2010 || WISE || WISE || — || align=right | 3.1 km || 
|-id=612 bgcolor=#d6d6d6
| 453612 ||  || — || October 31, 2005 || Kitt Peak || Spacewatch || — || align=right | 3.3 km || 
|-id=613 bgcolor=#E9E9E9
| 453613 ||  || — || July 28, 2010 || WISE || WISE || — || align=right | 2.4 km || 
|-id=614 bgcolor=#fefefe
| 453614 ||  || — || February 1, 2009 || Mount Lemmon || Mount Lemmon Survey || — || align=right | 1.3 km || 
|-id=615 bgcolor=#E9E9E9
| 453615 ||  || — || August 3, 2010 || Socorro || LINEAR || — || align=right | 1.6 km || 
|-id=616 bgcolor=#E9E9E9
| 453616 ||  || — || August 4, 2010 || Socorro || LINEAR || (5) || align=right data-sort-value="0.70" | 700 m || 
|-id=617 bgcolor=#E9E9E9
| 453617 ||  || — || February 9, 2008 || Mount Lemmon || Mount Lemmon Survey || — || align=right | 2.4 km || 
|-id=618 bgcolor=#E9E9E9
| 453618 ||  || — || August 10, 2010 || Kitt Peak || Spacewatch || — || align=right | 1.7 km || 
|-id=619 bgcolor=#E9E9E9
| 453619 ||  || — || February 9, 2008 || Mount Lemmon || Mount Lemmon Survey || — || align=right | 1.9 km || 
|-id=620 bgcolor=#E9E9E9
| 453620 ||  || — || August 10, 2010 || Kitt Peak || Spacewatch || — || align=right | 1.2 km || 
|-id=621 bgcolor=#E9E9E9
| 453621 ||  || — || October 23, 2006 || Catalina || CSS || ADE || align=right | 2.1 km || 
|-id=622 bgcolor=#E9E9E9
| 453622 ||  || — || September 2, 2010 || La Sagra || OAM Obs. || — || align=right | 2.6 km || 
|-id=623 bgcolor=#d6d6d6
| 453623 ||  || — || September 6, 2010 || Kitt Peak || Spacewatch || EOS || align=right | 1.6 km || 
|-id=624 bgcolor=#E9E9E9
| 453624 ||  || — || November 9, 1993 || Kitt Peak || Spacewatch || — || align=right | 1.4 km || 
|-id=625 bgcolor=#E9E9E9
| 453625 ||  || — || March 9, 2003 || Kitt Peak || Spacewatch ||  || align=right | 2.3 km || 
|-id=626 bgcolor=#E9E9E9
| 453626 ||  || — || September 11, 2010 || Kitt Peak || Spacewatch || EUN || align=right | 1.3 km || 
|-id=627 bgcolor=#E9E9E9
| 453627 ||  || — || March 6, 2008 || Mount Lemmon || Mount Lemmon Survey || — || align=right | 2.1 km || 
|-id=628 bgcolor=#E9E9E9
| 453628 ||  || — || September 16, 2010 || Mount Lemmon || Mount Lemmon Survey || — || align=right | 1.9 km || 
|-id=629 bgcolor=#E9E9E9
| 453629 ||  || — || March 5, 2008 || Mount Lemmon || Mount Lemmon Survey || — || align=right | 2.1 km || 
|-id=630 bgcolor=#E9E9E9
| 453630 ||  || — || September 19, 2001 || Socorro || LINEAR || — || align=right | 1.9 km || 
|-id=631 bgcolor=#E9E9E9
| 453631 ||  || — || February 14, 2008 || Mount Lemmon || Mount Lemmon Survey || — || align=right | 1.8 km || 
|-id=632 bgcolor=#E9E9E9
| 453632 ||  || — || June 7, 2010 || WISE || WISE || — || align=right | 1.5 km || 
|-id=633 bgcolor=#E9E9E9
| 453633 ||  || — || November 27, 2006 || Kitt Peak || Spacewatch || — || align=right | 2.0 km || 
|-id=634 bgcolor=#d6d6d6
| 453634 ||  || — || October 7, 2005 || Kitt Peak || Spacewatch || — || align=right | 2.8 km || 
|-id=635 bgcolor=#E9E9E9
| 453635 ||  || — || December 15, 2006 || Kitt Peak || Spacewatch || — || align=right | 1.5 km || 
|-id=636 bgcolor=#E9E9E9
| 453636 ||  || — || October 17, 2006 || Kitt Peak || Spacewatch || — || align=right | 1.3 km || 
|-id=637 bgcolor=#E9E9E9
| 453637 ||  || — || September 11, 2001 || Socorro || LINEAR || — || align=right | 1.8 km || 
|-id=638 bgcolor=#d6d6d6
| 453638 ||  || — || September 1, 2005 || Kitt Peak || Spacewatch || — || align=right | 2.4 km || 
|-id=639 bgcolor=#E9E9E9
| 453639 ||  || — || September 16, 2010 || Kitt Peak || Spacewatch || — || align=right | 1.4 km || 
|-id=640 bgcolor=#E9E9E9
| 453640 ||  || — || September 9, 2010 || Kitt Peak || Spacewatch || — || align=right | 1.9 km || 
|-id=641 bgcolor=#E9E9E9
| 453641 ||  || — || September 10, 2010 || Kitt Peak || Spacewatch || AST || align=right | 1.3 km || 
|-id=642 bgcolor=#E9E9E9
| 453642 ||  || — || March 29, 2008 || Mount Lemmon || Mount Lemmon Survey || — || align=right | 1.9 km || 
|-id=643 bgcolor=#E9E9E9
| 453643 ||  || — || December 13, 2006 || Kitt Peak || Spacewatch || AGN || align=right data-sort-value="0.92" | 920 m || 
|-id=644 bgcolor=#E9E9E9
| 453644 ||  || — || February 28, 2008 || Mount Lemmon || Mount Lemmon Survey || — || align=right | 2.1 km || 
|-id=645 bgcolor=#E9E9E9
| 453645 ||  || — || September 14, 2010 || Kitt Peak || Spacewatch || — || align=right | 1.4 km || 
|-id=646 bgcolor=#E9E9E9
| 453646 ||  || — || September 14, 2010 || Kitt Peak || Spacewatch || AGN || align=right data-sort-value="0.85" | 850 m || 
|-id=647 bgcolor=#E9E9E9
| 453647 ||  || — || May 30, 2009 || Mount Lemmon || Mount Lemmon Survey || — || align=right | 1.3 km || 
|-id=648 bgcolor=#E9E9E9
| 453648 ||  || — || October 1, 2010 || Mount Lemmon || Mount Lemmon Survey || — || align=right | 1.5 km || 
|-id=649 bgcolor=#E9E9E9
| 453649 ||  || — || September 4, 2010 || Kitt Peak || Spacewatch || — || align=right | 1.7 km || 
|-id=650 bgcolor=#d6d6d6
| 453650 ||  || — || October 1, 2005 || Mount Lemmon || Mount Lemmon Survey || EOS || align=right | 1.5 km || 
|-id=651 bgcolor=#E9E9E9
| 453651 ||  || — || December 21, 2006 || Kitt Peak || Spacewatch || — || align=right | 1.6 km || 
|-id=652 bgcolor=#d6d6d6
| 453652 ||  || — || July 12, 2005 || Mount Lemmon || Mount Lemmon Survey || — || align=right | 1.7 km || 
|-id=653 bgcolor=#E9E9E9
| 453653 ||  || — || October 9, 2010 || Kitt Peak || Spacewatch || — || align=right | 1.6 km || 
|-id=654 bgcolor=#d6d6d6
| 453654 ||  || — || April 4, 2008 || Kitt Peak || Spacewatch || — || align=right | 2.8 km || 
|-id=655 bgcolor=#E9E9E9
| 453655 ||  || — || April 1, 2008 || Kitt Peak || Spacewatch || — || align=right | 2.1 km || 
|-id=656 bgcolor=#d6d6d6
| 453656 ||  || — || August 30, 2005 || Kitt Peak || Spacewatch || KOR || align=right | 1.1 km || 
|-id=657 bgcolor=#d6d6d6
| 453657 ||  || — || September 28, 1994 || Kitt Peak || Spacewatch || — || align=right | 1.9 km || 
|-id=658 bgcolor=#E9E9E9
| 453658 ||  || — || October 11, 2010 || Mount Lemmon || Mount Lemmon Survey || — || align=right | 1.4 km || 
|-id=659 bgcolor=#E9E9E9
| 453659 ||  || — || October 2, 2010 || Kitt Peak || Spacewatch || — || align=right | 1.6 km || 
|-id=660 bgcolor=#E9E9E9
| 453660 ||  || — || September 17, 2010 || Mount Lemmon || Mount Lemmon Survey || — || align=right | 2.3 km || 
|-id=661 bgcolor=#d6d6d6
| 453661 ||  || — || October 7, 2005 || Kitt Peak || Spacewatch || KOR || align=right | 1.2 km || 
|-id=662 bgcolor=#d6d6d6
| 453662 ||  || — || October 2, 2010 || Mount Lemmon || Mount Lemmon Survey || — || align=right | 4.2 km || 
|-id=663 bgcolor=#E9E9E9
| 453663 ||  || — || December 14, 2001 || Socorro || LINEAR || — || align=right | 1.9 km || 
|-id=664 bgcolor=#d6d6d6
| 453664 ||  || — || April 15, 2007 || Kitt Peak || Spacewatch || EOS || align=right | 1.9 km || 
|-id=665 bgcolor=#E9E9E9
| 453665 ||  || — || August 11, 2010 || WISE || WISE || DOR || align=right | 2.8 km || 
|-id=666 bgcolor=#d6d6d6
| 453666 ||  || — || October 31, 2010 || Mount Lemmon || Mount Lemmon Survey || — || align=right | 2.4 km || 
|-id=667 bgcolor=#d6d6d6
| 453667 ||  || — || October 30, 2010 || Kitt Peak || Spacewatch || — || align=right | 2.7 km || 
|-id=668 bgcolor=#E9E9E9
| 453668 ||  || — || October 31, 2010 || Kitt Peak || Spacewatch || — || align=right | 2.1 km || 
|-id=669 bgcolor=#E9E9E9
| 453669 ||  || — || December 1, 2006 || Mount Lemmon || Mount Lemmon Survey || EUN || align=right | 1.2 km || 
|-id=670 bgcolor=#E9E9E9
| 453670 ||  || — || December 21, 2006 || Kitt Peak || Spacewatch || — || align=right | 2.0 km || 
|-id=671 bgcolor=#E9E9E9
| 453671 ||  || — || November 2, 2010 || Kitt Peak || Spacewatch || — || align=right | 1.7 km || 
|-id=672 bgcolor=#d6d6d6
| 453672 ||  || — || November 12, 1999 || Socorro || LINEAR || — || align=right | 2.7 km || 
|-id=673 bgcolor=#d6d6d6
| 453673 ||  || — || December 8, 2005 || Catalina || CSS || Tj (2.99) || align=right | 4.9 km || 
|-id=674 bgcolor=#d6d6d6
| 453674 ||  || — || October 27, 2005 || Mount Lemmon || Mount Lemmon Survey || — || align=right | 2.4 km || 
|-id=675 bgcolor=#E9E9E9
| 453675 ||  || — || January 17, 2007 || Kitt Peak || Spacewatch || AGN || align=right | 1.2 km || 
|-id=676 bgcolor=#E9E9E9
| 453676 ||  || — || October 17, 2010 || Mount Lemmon || Mount Lemmon Survey || — || align=right | 1.7 km || 
|-id=677 bgcolor=#E9E9E9
| 453677 ||  || — || November 3, 2010 || Kitt Peak || Spacewatch || — || align=right | 2.5 km || 
|-id=678 bgcolor=#E9E9E9
| 453678 ||  || — || October 28, 2010 || Mount Lemmon || Mount Lemmon Survey || — || align=right | 2.3 km || 
|-id=679 bgcolor=#d6d6d6
| 453679 ||  || — || November 1, 2010 || Kitt Peak || Spacewatch || — || align=right | 2.5 km || 
|-id=680 bgcolor=#E9E9E9
| 453680 ||  || — || October 17, 2010 || Mount Lemmon || Mount Lemmon Survey || — || align=right | 2.4 km || 
|-id=681 bgcolor=#d6d6d6
| 453681 ||  || — || November 10, 1999 || Kitt Peak || Spacewatch || EOS || align=right | 1.5 km || 
|-id=682 bgcolor=#d6d6d6
| 453682 ||  || — || December 3, 2005 || Kitt Peak || Spacewatch || — || align=right | 2.1 km || 
|-id=683 bgcolor=#d6d6d6
| 453683 ||  || — || November 7, 2010 || Kitt Peak || Spacewatch || — || align=right | 3.0 km || 
|-id=684 bgcolor=#d6d6d6
| 453684 ||  || — || October 28, 2005 || Mount Lemmon || Mount Lemmon Survey || — || align=right | 2.2 km || 
|-id=685 bgcolor=#d6d6d6
| 453685 ||  || — || October 7, 2004 || Kitt Peak || Spacewatch || — || align=right | 3.2 km || 
|-id=686 bgcolor=#d6d6d6
| 453686 ||  || — || November 5, 2010 || Kitt Peak || Spacewatch || — || align=right | 2.3 km || 
|-id=687 bgcolor=#FFC2E0
| 453687 ||  || — || May 17, 2010 || WISE || WISE || AMO || align=right data-sort-value="0.95" | 950 m || 
|-id=688 bgcolor=#d6d6d6
| 453688 ||  || — || November 3, 2010 || Mount Lemmon || Mount Lemmon Survey || — || align=right | 2.9 km || 
|-id=689 bgcolor=#d6d6d6
| 453689 ||  || — || October 30, 2010 || Mount Lemmon || Mount Lemmon Survey || BRA || align=right | 1.6 km || 
|-id=690 bgcolor=#d6d6d6
| 453690 ||  || — || October 28, 2010 || Mount Lemmon || Mount Lemmon Survey || — || align=right | 3.9 km || 
|-id=691 bgcolor=#E9E9E9
| 453691 ||  || — || October 12, 2010 || Mount Lemmon || Mount Lemmon Survey || GEF || align=right | 1.2 km || 
|-id=692 bgcolor=#E9E9E9
| 453692 ||  || — || November 17, 2001 || Kitt Peak || Spacewatch || GEF || align=right data-sort-value="0.82" | 820 m || 
|-id=693 bgcolor=#d6d6d6
| 453693 ||  || — || April 12, 2008 || Kitt Peak || Spacewatch || — || align=right | 4.0 km || 
|-id=694 bgcolor=#d6d6d6
| 453694 ||  || — || November 10, 2010 || Mount Lemmon || Mount Lemmon Survey || — || align=right | 2.8 km || 
|-id=695 bgcolor=#E9E9E9
| 453695 ||  || — || November 1, 2010 || Kitt Peak || Spacewatch || — || align=right | 2.7 km || 
|-id=696 bgcolor=#d6d6d6
| 453696 ||  || — || October 29, 2010 || Mount Lemmon || Mount Lemmon Survey || — || align=right | 2.7 km || 
|-id=697 bgcolor=#d6d6d6
| 453697 ||  || — || October 28, 2010 || Kitt Peak || Spacewatch || — || align=right | 3.6 km || 
|-id=698 bgcolor=#d6d6d6
| 453698 ||  || — || November 10, 2010 || Mount Lemmon || Mount Lemmon Survey || EOS || align=right | 1.9 km || 
|-id=699 bgcolor=#E9E9E9
| 453699 ||  || — || November 3, 2005 || Kitt Peak || Spacewatch || HOF || align=right | 2.6 km || 
|-id=700 bgcolor=#d6d6d6
| 453700 ||  || — || November 6, 2010 || Kitt Peak || Spacewatch || — || align=right | 2.8 km || 
|}

453701–453800 

|-bgcolor=#fefefe
| 453701 ||  || — || June 6, 2002 || Socorro || LINEAR || H || align=right data-sort-value="0.82" | 820 m || 
|-id=702 bgcolor=#fefefe
| 453702 ||  || — || December 1, 2010 || Mount Lemmon || Mount Lemmon Survey || H || align=right data-sort-value="0.87" | 870 m || 
|-id=703 bgcolor=#d6d6d6
| 453703 ||  || — || October 14, 2010 || Mount Lemmon || Mount Lemmon Survey || — || align=right | 3.3 km || 
|-id=704 bgcolor=#E9E9E9
| 453704 ||  || — || November 28, 2010 || Catalina || CSS || — || align=right | 1.8 km || 
|-id=705 bgcolor=#d6d6d6
| 453705 ||  || — || November 12, 2010 || Mount Lemmon || Mount Lemmon Survey || NAE || align=right | 3.0 km || 
|-id=706 bgcolor=#d6d6d6
| 453706 ||  || — || December 4, 2010 || Catalina || CSS || — || align=right | 3.6 km || 
|-id=707 bgcolor=#FFC2E0
| 453707 ||  || — || December 15, 2010 || Mount Lemmon || Mount Lemmon Survey || APOPHA || align=right data-sort-value="0.5" | 500 m || 
|-id=708 bgcolor=#d6d6d6
| 453708 ||  || — || December 25, 2005 || Kitt Peak || Spacewatch || — || align=right | 2.2 km || 
|-id=709 bgcolor=#d6d6d6
| 453709 ||  || — || January 5, 2000 || Socorro || LINEAR || — || align=right | 3.4 km || 
|-id=710 bgcolor=#d6d6d6
| 453710 ||  || — || April 22, 2007 || Kitt Peak || Spacewatch || EOS || align=right | 1.9 km || 
|-id=711 bgcolor=#d6d6d6
| 453711 ||  || — || November 16, 2009 || Mount Lemmon || Mount Lemmon Survey || — || align=right | 2.7 km || 
|-id=712 bgcolor=#d6d6d6
| 453712 ||  || — || September 27, 2009 || Kitt Peak || Spacewatch || — || align=right | 2.3 km || 
|-id=713 bgcolor=#d6d6d6
| 453713 ||  || — || January 2, 2011 || Mount Lemmon || Mount Lemmon Survey || — || align=right | 2.5 km || 
|-id=714 bgcolor=#d6d6d6
| 453714 ||  || — || December 6, 2010 || Mount Lemmon || Mount Lemmon Survey || — || align=right | 3.6 km || 
|-id=715 bgcolor=#d6d6d6
| 453715 ||  || — || January 5, 2011 || Catalina || CSS || — || align=right | 3.3 km || 
|-id=716 bgcolor=#d6d6d6
| 453716 ||  || — || February 1, 2006 || Mount Lemmon || Mount Lemmon Survey || — || align=right | 2.2 km || 
|-id=717 bgcolor=#d6d6d6
| 453717 ||  || — || October 9, 2004 || Kitt Peak || Spacewatch || — || align=right | 1.7 km || 
|-id=718 bgcolor=#d6d6d6
| 453718 ||  || — || January 10, 2011 || Mount Lemmon || Mount Lemmon Survey || — || align=right | 2.6 km || 
|-id=719 bgcolor=#d6d6d6
| 453719 ||  || — || January 17, 2010 || WISE || WISE || — || align=right | 3.7 km || 
|-id=720 bgcolor=#d6d6d6
| 453720 ||  || — || December 13, 2010 || Mount Lemmon || Mount Lemmon Survey || VER || align=right | 2.6 km || 
|-id=721 bgcolor=#d6d6d6
| 453721 ||  || — || January 3, 2011 || Mount Lemmon || Mount Lemmon Survey || — || align=right | 2.7 km || 
|-id=722 bgcolor=#fefefe
| 453722 ||  || — || September 19, 2007 || Catalina || CSS || H || align=right data-sort-value="0.91" | 910 m || 
|-id=723 bgcolor=#fefefe
| 453723 ||  || — || January 26, 2006 || Catalina || CSS || H || align=right data-sort-value="0.74" | 740 m || 
|-id=724 bgcolor=#d6d6d6
| 453724 ||  || — || January 5, 2000 || Kitt Peak || Spacewatch || THM || align=right | 1.6 km || 
|-id=725 bgcolor=#d6d6d6
| 453725 ||  || — || December 13, 2010 || Mount Lemmon || Mount Lemmon Survey || — || align=right | 2.8 km || 
|-id=726 bgcolor=#d6d6d6
| 453726 ||  || — || January 16, 2011 || Mount Lemmon || Mount Lemmon Survey || — || align=right | 3.2 km || 
|-id=727 bgcolor=#d6d6d6
| 453727 ||  || — || December 15, 2004 || Kitt Peak || Spacewatch || — || align=right | 2.2 km || 
|-id=728 bgcolor=#d6d6d6
| 453728 ||  || — || January 24, 2011 || Catalina || CSS || — || align=right | 3.5 km || 
|-id=729 bgcolor=#FFC2E0
| 453729 ||  || — || April 25, 2008 || Mount Lemmon || Mount Lemmon Survey || APOPHA || align=right data-sort-value="0.60" | 600 m || 
|-id=730 bgcolor=#d6d6d6
| 453730 ||  || — || February 9, 2010 || WISE || WISE || — || align=right | 4.9 km || 
|-id=731 bgcolor=#d6d6d6
| 453731 ||  || — || January 12, 2011 || Mount Lemmon || Mount Lemmon Survey || — || align=right | 3.1 km || 
|-id=732 bgcolor=#d6d6d6
| 453732 ||  || — || December 13, 2010 || Mount Lemmon || Mount Lemmon Survey || — || align=right | 2.9 km || 
|-id=733 bgcolor=#d6d6d6
| 453733 ||  || — || February 26, 2006 || Anderson Mesa || LONEOS || — || align=right | 3.6 km || 
|-id=734 bgcolor=#d6d6d6
| 453734 ||  || — || March 5, 2006 || Kitt Peak || Spacewatch || — || align=right | 1.9 km || 
|-id=735 bgcolor=#d6d6d6
| 453735 ||  || — || October 21, 2009 || Mount Lemmon || Mount Lemmon Survey || — || align=right | 3.5 km || 
|-id=736 bgcolor=#d6d6d6
| 453736 ||  || — || January 28, 2011 || Mount Lemmon || Mount Lemmon Survey || EOS || align=right | 2.2 km || 
|-id=737 bgcolor=#d6d6d6
| 453737 ||  || — || November 15, 2010 || Mount Lemmon || Mount Lemmon Survey || — || align=right | 2.8 km || 
|-id=738 bgcolor=#d6d6d6
| 453738 ||  || — || January 14, 2011 || Mount Lemmon || Mount Lemmon Survey || — || align=right | 2.4 km || 
|-id=739 bgcolor=#d6d6d6
| 453739 ||  || — || December 30, 2005 || Kitt Peak || Spacewatch || — || align=right | 2.5 km || 
|-id=740 bgcolor=#d6d6d6
| 453740 ||  || — || January 14, 2011 || Mount Lemmon || Mount Lemmon Survey || — || align=right | 2.4 km || 
|-id=741 bgcolor=#d6d6d6
| 453741 ||  || — || January 14, 2011 || Kitt Peak || Spacewatch || — || align=right | 2.8 km || 
|-id=742 bgcolor=#d6d6d6
| 453742 ||  || — || January 29, 2011 || Kitt Peak || Spacewatch || — || align=right | 2.5 km || 
|-id=743 bgcolor=#d6d6d6
| 453743 ||  || — || November 19, 2004 || Catalina || CSS || — || align=right | 3.0 km || 
|-id=744 bgcolor=#d6d6d6
| 453744 ||  || — || January 10, 2011 || Kitt Peak || Spacewatch || LIX || align=right | 2.9 km || 
|-id=745 bgcolor=#d6d6d6
| 453745 ||  || — || January 11, 2011 || Catalina || CSS || — || align=right | 2.5 km || 
|-id=746 bgcolor=#d6d6d6
| 453746 ||  || — || January 5, 2000 || Kitt Peak || Spacewatch || EOS || align=right | 1.9 km || 
|-id=747 bgcolor=#d6d6d6
| 453747 ||  || — || November 8, 2009 || Mount Lemmon || Mount Lemmon Survey || THM || align=right | 2.3 km || 
|-id=748 bgcolor=#d6d6d6
| 453748 ||  || — || January 30, 2006 || Kitt Peak || Spacewatch || — || align=right | 2.9 km || 
|-id=749 bgcolor=#d6d6d6
| 453749 ||  || — || February 27, 2006 || Kitt Peak || Spacewatch || — || align=right | 2.4 km || 
|-id=750 bgcolor=#d6d6d6
| 453750 ||  || — || September 19, 2003 || Kitt Peak || Spacewatch || — || align=right | 3.2 km || 
|-id=751 bgcolor=#d6d6d6
| 453751 ||  || — || February 8, 2010 || WISE || WISE || — || align=right | 4.3 km || 
|-id=752 bgcolor=#d6d6d6
| 453752 ||  || — || January 11, 2011 || Kitt Peak || Spacewatch || — || align=right | 3.0 km || 
|-id=753 bgcolor=#d6d6d6
| 453753 ||  || — || October 26, 2009 || Mount Lemmon || Mount Lemmon Survey || — || align=right | 2.8 km || 
|-id=754 bgcolor=#d6d6d6
| 453754 ||  || — || September 25, 2008 || Mount Lemmon || Mount Lemmon Survey || — || align=right | 3.0 km || 
|-id=755 bgcolor=#d6d6d6
| 453755 ||  || — || December 11, 2004 || Kitt Peak || Spacewatch || — || align=right | 2.6 km || 
|-id=756 bgcolor=#FA8072
| 453756 ||  || — || January 27, 2011 || Mount Lemmon || Mount Lemmon Survey || H || align=right data-sort-value="0.75" | 750 m || 
|-id=757 bgcolor=#d6d6d6
| 453757 ||  || — || September 16, 2009 || Mount Lemmon || Mount Lemmon Survey || — || align=right | 2.1 km || 
|-id=758 bgcolor=#d6d6d6
| 453758 ||  || — || May 20, 2006 || Catalina || CSS || — || align=right | 3.0 km || 
|-id=759 bgcolor=#d6d6d6
| 453759 ||  || — || March 25, 2006 || Mount Lemmon || Mount Lemmon Survey || — || align=right | 3.0 km || 
|-id=760 bgcolor=#d6d6d6
| 453760 ||  || — || April 29, 2000 || Anderson Mesa || LONEOS || — || align=right | 4.2 km || 
|-id=761 bgcolor=#d6d6d6
| 453761 ||  || — || January 29, 2011 || Kitt Peak || Spacewatch || — || align=right | 3.0 km || 
|-id=762 bgcolor=#d6d6d6
| 453762 ||  || — || February 29, 2000 || Socorro || LINEAR || — || align=right | 2.9 km || 
|-id=763 bgcolor=#d6d6d6
| 453763 ||  || — || March 4, 2011 || Catalina || CSS || — || align=right | 3.2 km || 
|-id=764 bgcolor=#d6d6d6
| 453764 ||  || — || January 16, 2005 || Kitt Peak || Spacewatch || THM || align=right | 2.0 km || 
|-id=765 bgcolor=#d6d6d6
| 453765 ||  || — || January 16, 2005 || Kitt Peak || Spacewatch || — || align=right | 2.6 km || 
|-id=766 bgcolor=#fefefe
| 453766 ||  || — || December 13, 2002 || Socorro || LINEAR || H || align=right data-sort-value="0.95" | 950 m || 
|-id=767 bgcolor=#d6d6d6
| 453767 ||  || — || March 11, 2005 || Mount Lemmon || Mount Lemmon Survey || — || align=right | 3.1 km || 
|-id=768 bgcolor=#d6d6d6
| 453768 ||  || — || February 9, 2005 || Anderson Mesa || LONEOS || LIX || align=right | 3.4 km || 
|-id=769 bgcolor=#d6d6d6
| 453769 ||  || — || November 9, 2009 || Mount Lemmon || Mount Lemmon Survey || — || align=right | 4.0 km || 
|-id=770 bgcolor=#fefefe
| 453770 ||  || — || March 9, 2003 || Anderson Mesa || LONEOS || H || align=right data-sort-value="0.66" | 660 m || 
|-id=771 bgcolor=#d6d6d6
| 453771 ||  || — || March 20, 2010 || WISE || WISE || — || align=right | 3.8 km || 
|-id=772 bgcolor=#fefefe
| 453772 ||  || — || April 13, 2008 || Kitt Peak || Spacewatch || — || align=right data-sort-value="0.60" | 600 m || 
|-id=773 bgcolor=#d6d6d6
| 453773 ||  || — || March 13, 2011 || Mount Lemmon || Mount Lemmon Survey || — || align=right | 4.0 km || 
|-id=774 bgcolor=#d6d6d6
| 453774 ||  || — || March 17, 2005 || Mount Lemmon || Mount Lemmon Survey || — || align=right | 2.7 km || 
|-id=775 bgcolor=#FA8072
| 453775 ||  || — || June 29, 2008 || Siding Spring || SSS || — || align=right | 1.0 km || 
|-id=776 bgcolor=#fefefe
| 453776 ||  || — || February 7, 2008 || Catalina || CSS || H || align=right data-sort-value="0.90" | 900 m || 
|-id=777 bgcolor=#fefefe
| 453777 ||  || — || April 4, 2008 || Catalina || CSS || H || align=right data-sort-value="0.73" | 730 m || 
|-id=778 bgcolor=#FFC2E0
| 453778 ||  || — || May 1, 2011 || Mount Lemmon || Mount Lemmon Survey || AMOPHA || align=right data-sort-value="0.69" | 690 m || 
|-id=779 bgcolor=#C2FFFF
| 453779 ||  || — || May 7, 2011 || Mount Lemmon || Mount Lemmon Survey || L5 || align=right | 10 km || 
|-id=780 bgcolor=#FA8072
| 453780 ||  || — || September 24, 1995 || Kitt Peak || Spacewatch || — || align=right data-sort-value="0.54" | 540 m || 
|-id=781 bgcolor=#fefefe
| 453781 ||  || — || September 11, 2001 || Socorro || LINEAR || — || align=right | 1.4 km || 
|-id=782 bgcolor=#fefefe
| 453782 ||  || — || July 28, 2008 || Mount Lemmon || Mount Lemmon Survey || — || align=right data-sort-value="0.64" | 640 m || 
|-id=783 bgcolor=#fefefe
| 453783 ||  || — || May 21, 2011 || Kitt Peak || Spacewatch || — || align=right data-sort-value="0.70" | 700 m || 
|-id=784 bgcolor=#fefefe
| 453784 ||  || — || June 12, 2011 || Mount Lemmon || Mount Lemmon Survey || — || align=right data-sort-value="0.81" | 810 m || 
|-id=785 bgcolor=#fefefe
| 453785 ||  || — || September 13, 2005 || Kitt Peak || Spacewatch || — || align=right data-sort-value="0.60" | 600 m || 
|-id=786 bgcolor=#fefefe
| 453786 ||  || — || March 12, 2007 || Kitt Peak || Spacewatch || — || align=right data-sort-value="0.82" | 820 m || 
|-id=787 bgcolor=#fefefe
| 453787 ||  || — || December 2, 2008 || Mount Lemmon || Mount Lemmon Survey || V || align=right data-sort-value="0.59" | 590 m || 
|-id=788 bgcolor=#fefefe
| 453788 ||  || — || January 26, 2006 || Kitt Peak || Spacewatch || — || align=right data-sort-value="0.87" | 870 m || 
|-id=789 bgcolor=#C2FFFF
| 453789 ||  || — || April 1, 2010 || WISE || WISE || L5 || align=right | 11 km || 
|-id=790 bgcolor=#fefefe
| 453790 ||  || — || October 10, 2008 || Mount Lemmon || Mount Lemmon Survey || — || align=right data-sort-value="0.63" | 630 m || 
|-id=791 bgcolor=#fefefe
| 453791 ||  || — || June 11, 2011 || Mount Lemmon || Mount Lemmon Survey || — || align=right data-sort-value="0.86" | 860 m || 
|-id=792 bgcolor=#fefefe
| 453792 ||  || — || February 17, 2010 || Kitt Peak || Spacewatch || — || align=right data-sort-value="0.65" | 650 m || 
|-id=793 bgcolor=#fefefe
| 453793 ||  || — || November 21, 2000 || Socorro || LINEAR || — || align=right data-sort-value="0.93" | 930 m || 
|-id=794 bgcolor=#fefefe
| 453794 ||  || — || September 25, 2000 || Kitt Peak || Spacewatch || — || align=right data-sort-value="0.62" | 620 m || 
|-id=795 bgcolor=#fefefe
| 453795 ||  || — || March 11, 2007 || Kitt Peak || Spacewatch || — || align=right data-sort-value="0.71" | 710 m || 
|-id=796 bgcolor=#fefefe
| 453796 ||  || — || October 12, 2004 || Kitt Peak || Spacewatch || MAS || align=right data-sort-value="0.67" | 670 m || 
|-id=797 bgcolor=#fefefe
| 453797 ||  || — || March 15, 2010 || Kitt Peak || Spacewatch || — || align=right data-sort-value="0.76" | 760 m || 
|-id=798 bgcolor=#fefefe
| 453798 ||  || — || March 11, 1999 || Kitt Peak || Spacewatch || — || align=right data-sort-value="0.81" | 810 m || 
|-id=799 bgcolor=#fefefe
| 453799 ||  || — || September 18, 2011 || Mount Lemmon || Mount Lemmon Survey || MAS || align=right data-sort-value="0.70" | 700 m || 
|-id=800 bgcolor=#fefefe
| 453800 ||  || — || October 24, 2008 || Kitt Peak || Spacewatch || — || align=right data-sort-value="0.75" | 750 m || 
|}

453801–453900 

|-bgcolor=#fefefe
| 453801 ||  || — || November 7, 2008 || Mount Lemmon || Mount Lemmon Survey || — || align=right data-sort-value="0.66" | 660 m || 
|-id=802 bgcolor=#fefefe
| 453802 ||  || — || January 3, 2009 || Mount Lemmon || Mount Lemmon Survey || — || align=right data-sort-value="0.94" | 940 m || 
|-id=803 bgcolor=#fefefe
| 453803 ||  || — || September 18, 2011 || Catalina || CSS || — || align=right data-sort-value="0.86" | 860 m || 
|-id=804 bgcolor=#fefefe
| 453804 ||  || — || February 1, 2009 || Kitt Peak || Spacewatch || MAS || align=right data-sort-value="0.78" | 780 m || 
|-id=805 bgcolor=#fefefe
| 453805 ||  || — || August 16, 2007 || XuYi || PMO NEO || — || align=right data-sort-value="0.82" | 820 m || 
|-id=806 bgcolor=#fefefe
| 453806 ||  || — || October 27, 2005 || Kitt Peak || Spacewatch || — || align=right data-sort-value="0.74" | 740 m || 
|-id=807 bgcolor=#FA8072
| 453807 ||  || — || November 1, 2000 || Socorro || LINEAR || — || align=right data-sort-value="0.98" | 980 m || 
|-id=808 bgcolor=#fefefe
| 453808 ||  || — || September 22, 2011 || Kitt Peak || Spacewatch || NYS || align=right data-sort-value="0.78" | 780 m || 
|-id=809 bgcolor=#fefefe
| 453809 ||  || — || January 22, 2006 || Mount Lemmon || Mount Lemmon Survey || — || align=right | 1.2 km || 
|-id=810 bgcolor=#fefefe
| 453810 ||  || — || December 2, 2008 || Kitt Peak || Spacewatch || — || align=right data-sort-value="0.62" | 620 m || 
|-id=811 bgcolor=#fefefe
| 453811 ||  || — || November 11, 2004 || Kitt Peak || Spacewatch || NYScritical || align=right data-sort-value="0.50" | 500 m || 
|-id=812 bgcolor=#E9E9E9
| 453812 ||  || — || December 5, 2007 || Kitt Peak || Spacewatch || — || align=right | 1.2 km || 
|-id=813 bgcolor=#fefefe
| 453813 ||  || — || April 20, 2010 || Kitt Peak || Spacewatch || — || align=right data-sort-value="0.86" | 860 m || 
|-id=814 bgcolor=#E9E9E9
| 453814 ||  || — || December 4, 2007 || Catalina || CSS || — || align=right data-sort-value="0.70" | 700 m || 
|-id=815 bgcolor=#fefefe
| 453815 ||  || — || October 11, 2004 || Kitt Peak || Spacewatch || NYS || align=right data-sort-value="0.42" | 420 m || 
|-id=816 bgcolor=#fefefe
| 453816 ||  || — || July 3, 2003 || Kitt Peak || Spacewatch || — || align=right | 1.1 km || 
|-id=817 bgcolor=#fefefe
| 453817 ||  || — || September 10, 2007 || Mount Lemmon || Mount Lemmon Survey || — || align=right data-sort-value="0.69" | 690 m || 
|-id=818 bgcolor=#fefefe
| 453818 ||  || — || March 18, 2010 || Mount Lemmon || Mount Lemmon Survey || — || align=right data-sort-value="0.58" | 580 m || 
|-id=819 bgcolor=#fefefe
| 453819 ||  || — || December 10, 2004 || Socorro || LINEAR || — || align=right data-sort-value="0.81" | 810 m || 
|-id=820 bgcolor=#fefefe
| 453820 ||  || — || January 16, 2009 || Kitt Peak || Spacewatch || — || align=right data-sort-value="0.81" | 810 m || 
|-id=821 bgcolor=#fefefe
| 453821 ||  || — || December 31, 2008 || Kitt Peak || Spacewatch || NYS || align=right data-sort-value="0.66" | 660 m || 
|-id=822 bgcolor=#E9E9E9
| 453822 ||  || — || September 23, 2011 || Kitt Peak || Spacewatch || — || align=right | 1.6 km || 
|-id=823 bgcolor=#fefefe
| 453823 ||  || — || September 10, 2007 || Kitt Peak || Spacewatch || — || align=right data-sort-value="0.65" | 650 m || 
|-id=824 bgcolor=#E9E9E9
| 453824 ||  || — || October 8, 2007 || Mount Lemmon || Mount Lemmon Survey || (5) || align=right data-sort-value="0.76" | 760 m || 
|-id=825 bgcolor=#fefefe
| 453825 ||  || — || September 12, 2007 || Kitt Peak || Spacewatch || — || align=right data-sort-value="0.71" | 710 m || 
|-id=826 bgcolor=#fefefe
| 453826 ||  || — || April 26, 2006 || Kitt Peak || Spacewatch || — || align=right data-sort-value="0.98" | 980 m || 
|-id=827 bgcolor=#fefefe
| 453827 ||  || — || January 20, 2009 || Kitt Peak || Spacewatch || NYS || align=right data-sort-value="0.65" | 650 m || 
|-id=828 bgcolor=#fefefe
| 453828 ||  || — || March 25, 2006 || Kitt Peak || Spacewatch || — || align=right | 1.0 km || 
|-id=829 bgcolor=#fefefe
| 453829 ||  || — || December 18, 2004 || Mount Lemmon || Mount Lemmon Survey || — || align=right data-sort-value="0.60" | 600 m || 
|-id=830 bgcolor=#fefefe
| 453830 ||  || — || August 23, 2007 || Kitt Peak || Spacewatch || MAS || align=right data-sort-value="0.82" | 820 m || 
|-id=831 bgcolor=#E9E9E9
| 453831 ||  || — || November 19, 2003 || Kitt Peak || Spacewatch || — || align=right data-sort-value="0.70" | 700 m || 
|-id=832 bgcolor=#fefefe
| 453832 ||  || — || September 20, 2011 || Kitt Peak || Spacewatch || V || align=right data-sort-value="0.70" | 700 m || 
|-id=833 bgcolor=#fefefe
| 453833 ||  || — || March 13, 2010 || Mount Lemmon || Mount Lemmon Survey || NYS || align=right data-sort-value="0.69" | 690 m || 
|-id=834 bgcolor=#fefefe
| 453834 ||  || — || February 4, 2005 || Catalina || CSS || — || align=right data-sort-value="0.97" | 970 m || 
|-id=835 bgcolor=#E9E9E9
| 453835 ||  || — || September 18, 2003 || Kitt Peak || Spacewatch || — || align=right data-sort-value="0.57" | 570 m || 
|-id=836 bgcolor=#fefefe
| 453836 ||  || — || September 11, 2007 || Mount Lemmon || Mount Lemmon Survey || MAS || align=right data-sort-value="0.59" | 590 m || 
|-id=837 bgcolor=#fefefe
| 453837 ||  || — || September 8, 2011 || Kitt Peak || Spacewatch || CLA || align=right | 1.6 km || 
|-id=838 bgcolor=#fefefe
| 453838 ||  || — || November 2, 2000 || Kitt Peak || Spacewatch || MAS || align=right data-sort-value="0.55" | 550 m || 
|-id=839 bgcolor=#fefefe
| 453839 ||  || — || November 21, 1993 || Kitt Peak || Spacewatch || — || align=right data-sort-value="0.80" | 800 m || 
|-id=840 bgcolor=#fefefe
| 453840 ||  || — || September 8, 2011 || Kitt Peak || Spacewatch || — || align=right data-sort-value="0.75" | 750 m || 
|-id=841 bgcolor=#fefefe
| 453841 ||  || — || March 26, 2007 || Mount Lemmon || Mount Lemmon Survey || — || align=right data-sort-value="0.66" | 660 m || 
|-id=842 bgcolor=#fefefe
| 453842 ||  || — || January 30, 2006 || Kitt Peak || Spacewatch || — || align=right data-sort-value="0.76" | 760 m || 
|-id=843 bgcolor=#fefefe
| 453843 ||  || — || August 9, 2007 || Kitt Peak || Spacewatch || V || align=right data-sort-value="0.74" | 740 m || 
|-id=844 bgcolor=#E9E9E9
| 453844 ||  || — || September 26, 2011 || Kitt Peak || Spacewatch || (5) || align=right data-sort-value="0.68" | 680 m || 
|-id=845 bgcolor=#fefefe
| 453845 ||  || — || September 20, 2011 || Catalina || CSS || — || align=right | 1.1 km || 
|-id=846 bgcolor=#fefefe
| 453846 ||  || — || September 23, 2011 || Kitt Peak || Spacewatch || — || align=right data-sort-value="0.90" | 900 m || 
|-id=847 bgcolor=#fefefe
| 453847 ||  || — || February 20, 2009 || Catalina || CSS || — || align=right | 1.1 km || 
|-id=848 bgcolor=#fefefe
| 453848 ||  || — || December 18, 2004 || Mount Lemmon || Mount Lemmon Survey || MAS || align=right data-sort-value="0.68" | 680 m || 
|-id=849 bgcolor=#fefefe
| 453849 ||  || — || September 14, 2007 || Anderson Mesa || LONEOS || — || align=right data-sort-value="0.78" | 780 m || 
|-id=850 bgcolor=#fefefe
| 453850 ||  || — || December 20, 2004 || Mount Lemmon || Mount Lemmon Survey || — || align=right data-sort-value="0.76" | 760 m || 
|-id=851 bgcolor=#fefefe
| 453851 ||  || — || February 19, 2001 || Socorro || LINEAR || — || align=right data-sort-value="0.87" | 870 m || 
|-id=852 bgcolor=#fefefe
| 453852 ||  || — || October 15, 2007 || Kitt Peak || Spacewatch || — || align=right data-sort-value="0.59" | 590 m || 
|-id=853 bgcolor=#fefefe
| 453853 ||  || — || February 2, 2009 || Kitt Peak || Spacewatch || — || align=right data-sort-value="0.72" | 720 m || 
|-id=854 bgcolor=#fefefe
| 453854 ||  || — || November 10, 2004 || Kitt Peak || Spacewatch || — || align=right data-sort-value="0.67" | 670 m || 
|-id=855 bgcolor=#E9E9E9
| 453855 ||  || — || October 18, 2011 || Kitt Peak || Spacewatch || EUN || align=right data-sort-value="0.87" | 870 m || 
|-id=856 bgcolor=#E9E9E9
| 453856 ||  || — || November 19, 2007 || Kitt Peak || Spacewatch || MAR || align=right data-sort-value="0.76" | 760 m || 
|-id=857 bgcolor=#fefefe
| 453857 ||  || — || October 18, 2011 || Kitt Peak || Spacewatch || — || align=right data-sort-value="0.80" | 800 m || 
|-id=858 bgcolor=#fefefe
| 453858 ||  || — || October 20, 2011 || Mount Lemmon || Mount Lemmon Survey || — || align=right data-sort-value="0.84" | 840 m || 
|-id=859 bgcolor=#fefefe
| 453859 ||  || — || September 23, 2011 || Kitt Peak || Spacewatch || — || align=right data-sort-value="0.71" | 710 m || 
|-id=860 bgcolor=#fefefe
| 453860 ||  || — || January 18, 2009 || Kitt Peak || Spacewatch || NYS || align=right data-sort-value="0.74" | 740 m || 
|-id=861 bgcolor=#E9E9E9
| 453861 ||  || — || October 19, 2011 || Kitt Peak || Spacewatch || — || align=right | 1.1 km || 
|-id=862 bgcolor=#fefefe
| 453862 ||  || — || October 20, 2011 || Mount Lemmon || Mount Lemmon Survey || — || align=right | 1.00 km || 
|-id=863 bgcolor=#fefefe
| 453863 ||  || — || December 22, 2008 || Mount Lemmon || Mount Lemmon Survey || NYS || align=right data-sort-value="0.54" | 540 m || 
|-id=864 bgcolor=#fefefe
| 453864 ||  || — || December 10, 2004 || Kitt Peak || Spacewatch || — || align=right data-sort-value="0.73" | 730 m || 
|-id=865 bgcolor=#E9E9E9
| 453865 ||  || — || October 14, 2007 || Kitt Peak || Spacewatch || — || align=right | 1.1 km || 
|-id=866 bgcolor=#E9E9E9
| 453866 ||  || — || October 20, 2011 || Mount Lemmon || Mount Lemmon Survey || — || align=right | 1.3 km || 
|-id=867 bgcolor=#fefefe
| 453867 ||  || — || September 20, 2003 || Campo Imperatore || CINEOS || — || align=right data-sort-value="0.72" | 720 m || 
|-id=868 bgcolor=#fefefe
| 453868 ||  || — || May 11, 2010 || Mount Lemmon || Mount Lemmon Survey || — || align=right | 1.0 km || 
|-id=869 bgcolor=#fefefe
| 453869 ||  || — || October 1, 2000 || Anderson Mesa || LONEOS || — || align=right data-sort-value="0.81" | 810 m || 
|-id=870 bgcolor=#fefefe
| 453870 ||  || — || September 21, 2000 || Kitt Peak || Spacewatch || — || align=right data-sort-value="0.62" | 620 m || 
|-id=871 bgcolor=#fefefe
| 453871 ||  || — || January 19, 2009 || Mount Lemmon || Mount Lemmon Survey || — || align=right data-sort-value="0.74" | 740 m || 
|-id=872 bgcolor=#fefefe
| 453872 ||  || — || September 13, 2007 || Mount Lemmon || Mount Lemmon Survey || — || align=right data-sort-value="0.78" | 780 m || 
|-id=873 bgcolor=#E9E9E9
| 453873 ||  || — || October 20, 2011 || Kitt Peak || Spacewatch || — || align=right | 1.4 km || 
|-id=874 bgcolor=#E9E9E9
| 453874 ||  || — || April 1, 2000 || Kitt Peak || Spacewatch || — || align=right | 2.2 km || 
|-id=875 bgcolor=#E9E9E9
| 453875 ||  || — || November 20, 2007 || Kitt Peak || Spacewatch || — || align=right data-sort-value="0.91" | 910 m || 
|-id=876 bgcolor=#fefefe
| 453876 ||  || — || September 20, 2011 || Kitt Peak || Spacewatch || — || align=right data-sort-value="0.94" | 940 m || 
|-id=877 bgcolor=#fefefe
| 453877 ||  || — || October 22, 2011 || Kitt Peak || Spacewatch || NYS || align=right data-sort-value="0.62" | 620 m || 
|-id=878 bgcolor=#fefefe
| 453878 ||  || — || October 4, 2007 || Mount Lemmon || Mount Lemmon Survey || NYS || align=right data-sort-value="0.61" | 610 m || 
|-id=879 bgcolor=#fefefe
| 453879 ||  || — || September 29, 2011 || Mount Lemmon || Mount Lemmon Survey || — || align=right data-sort-value="0.84" | 840 m || 
|-id=880 bgcolor=#fefefe
| 453880 ||  || — || September 12, 2007 || Mount Lemmon || Mount Lemmon Survey || NYScritical || align=right data-sort-value="0.52" | 520 m || 
|-id=881 bgcolor=#E9E9E9
| 453881 ||  || — || October 22, 2011 || Kitt Peak || Spacewatch || — || align=right | 1.3 km || 
|-id=882 bgcolor=#E9E9E9
| 453882 ||  || — || October 24, 2011 || Mount Lemmon || Mount Lemmon Survey || — || align=right | 1.0 km || 
|-id=883 bgcolor=#E9E9E9
| 453883 ||  || — || October 3, 2011 || Mount Lemmon || Mount Lemmon Survey || — || align=right | 1.5 km || 
|-id=884 bgcolor=#E9E9E9
| 453884 ||  || — || October 21, 2011 || Kitt Peak || Spacewatch || NEM || align=right | 2.1 km || 
|-id=885 bgcolor=#fefefe
| 453885 ||  || — || January 1, 2009 || Mount Lemmon || Mount Lemmon Survey || — || align=right data-sort-value="0.66" | 660 m || 
|-id=886 bgcolor=#E9E9E9
| 453886 ||  || — || May 4, 2009 || Mount Lemmon || Mount Lemmon Survey || — || align=right | 1.5 km || 
|-id=887 bgcolor=#E9E9E9
| 453887 ||  || — || November 8, 2007 || Kitt Peak || Spacewatch || — || align=right | 1.5 km || 
|-id=888 bgcolor=#fefefe
| 453888 ||  || — || March 5, 2010 || WISE || WISE || — || align=right | 2.3 km || 
|-id=889 bgcolor=#E9E9E9
| 453889 ||  || — || November 9, 2007 || Catalina || CSS || (5) || align=right data-sort-value="0.84" | 840 m || 
|-id=890 bgcolor=#E9E9E9
| 453890 ||  || — || November 12, 2007 || Mount Lemmon || Mount Lemmon Survey || — || align=right | 1.4 km || 
|-id=891 bgcolor=#E9E9E9
| 453891 ||  || — || September 23, 2011 || Mount Lemmon || Mount Lemmon Survey || (5) || align=right data-sort-value="0.80" | 800 m || 
|-id=892 bgcolor=#fefefe
| 453892 ||  || — || July 15, 2007 || Siding Spring || SSS || — || align=right | 1.2 km || 
|-id=893 bgcolor=#E9E9E9
| 453893 ||  || — || August 27, 2006 || Kitt Peak || Spacewatch || PAD || align=right | 1.4 km || 
|-id=894 bgcolor=#fefefe
| 453894 ||  || — || February 3, 2009 || Kitt Peak || Spacewatch || NYS || align=right data-sort-value="0.54" | 540 m || 
|-id=895 bgcolor=#E9E9E9
| 453895 ||  || — || November 17, 2007 || Catalina || CSS || — || align=right data-sort-value="0.92" | 920 m || 
|-id=896 bgcolor=#fefefe
| 453896 ||  || — || September 4, 2007 || Catalina || CSS || MAS || align=right data-sort-value="0.68" | 680 m || 
|-id=897 bgcolor=#fefefe
| 453897 ||  || — || September 12, 2007 || Anderson Mesa || LONEOS || MAS || align=right data-sort-value="0.65" | 650 m || 
|-id=898 bgcolor=#fefefe
| 453898 ||  || — || August 24, 2007 || Kitt Peak || Spacewatch || NYS || align=right data-sort-value="0.67" | 670 m || 
|-id=899 bgcolor=#fefefe
| 453899 ||  || — || October 28, 2011 || Kitt Peak || Spacewatch || — || align=right data-sort-value="0.91" | 910 m || 
|-id=900 bgcolor=#fefefe
| 453900 ||  || — || February 20, 2009 || Kitt Peak || Spacewatch || NYS || align=right data-sort-value="0.68" | 680 m || 
|}

453901–454000 

|-bgcolor=#fefefe
| 453901 ||  || — || October 21, 2011 || Kitt Peak || Spacewatch || MAS || align=right data-sort-value="0.61" | 610 m || 
|-id=902 bgcolor=#fefefe
| 453902 ||  || — || June 21, 2007 || Mount Lemmon || Mount Lemmon Survey || V || align=right data-sort-value="0.55" | 550 m || 
|-id=903 bgcolor=#E9E9E9
| 453903 ||  || — || October 22, 2011 || Kitt Peak || Spacewatch || — || align=right | 1.5 km || 
|-id=904 bgcolor=#E9E9E9
| 453904 ||  || — || December 19, 2007 || Kitt Peak || Spacewatch || (5) || align=right data-sort-value="0.79" | 790 m || 
|-id=905 bgcolor=#E9E9E9
| 453905 ||  || — || November 20, 2007 || Kitt Peak || Spacewatch || — || align=right | 1.4 km || 
|-id=906 bgcolor=#fefefe
| 453906 ||  || — || September 12, 2007 || Kitt Peak || Spacewatch || CLA || align=right | 1.5 km || 
|-id=907 bgcolor=#E9E9E9
| 453907 ||  || — || September 29, 2011 || Kitt Peak || Spacewatch || — || align=right | 1.4 km || 
|-id=908 bgcolor=#fefefe
| 453908 ||  || — || January 15, 2005 || Socorro || LINEAR || — || align=right data-sort-value="0.62" | 620 m || 
|-id=909 bgcolor=#fefefe
| 453909 ||  || — || October 21, 2011 || Mount Lemmon || Mount Lemmon Survey || — || align=right data-sort-value="0.70" | 700 m || 
|-id=910 bgcolor=#fefefe
| 453910 ||  || — || December 30, 2008 || Kitt Peak || Spacewatch || — || align=right data-sort-value="0.98" | 980 m || 
|-id=911 bgcolor=#E9E9E9
| 453911 ||  || — || October 30, 2002 || Kitt Peak || Spacewatch || — || align=right | 1.9 km || 
|-id=912 bgcolor=#E9E9E9
| 453912 ||  || — || October 1, 2011 || Mount Lemmon || Mount Lemmon Survey || KON || align=right | 2.1 km || 
|-id=913 bgcolor=#fefefe
| 453913 ||  || — || February 4, 2005 || Kitt Peak || Spacewatch || — || align=right | 1.0 km || 
|-id=914 bgcolor=#fefefe
| 453914 ||  || — || April 6, 2005 || Mount Lemmon || Mount Lemmon Survey || — || align=right data-sort-value="0.60" | 600 m || 
|-id=915 bgcolor=#fefefe
| 453915 ||  || — || October 18, 2011 || Kitt Peak || Spacewatch || — || align=right | 1.0 km || 
|-id=916 bgcolor=#fefefe
| 453916 ||  || — || January 16, 2005 || Kitt Peak || Spacewatch || — || align=right data-sort-value="0.63" | 630 m || 
|-id=917 bgcolor=#fefefe
| 453917 ||  || — || September 11, 2007 || Mount Lemmon || Mount Lemmon Survey || — || align=right data-sort-value="0.62" | 620 m || 
|-id=918 bgcolor=#fefefe
| 453918 ||  || — || March 10, 2005 || Anderson Mesa || LONEOS || — || align=right data-sort-value="0.84" | 840 m || 
|-id=919 bgcolor=#fefefe
| 453919 ||  || — || September 18, 2007 || Kitt Peak || Spacewatch || critical || align=right data-sort-value="0.65" | 650 m || 
|-id=920 bgcolor=#E9E9E9
| 453920 ||  || — || October 21, 2011 || Mount Lemmon || Mount Lemmon Survey || — || align=right | 1.0 km || 
|-id=921 bgcolor=#E9E9E9
| 453921 ||  || — || November 18, 2007 || Mount Lemmon || Mount Lemmon Survey || — || align=right data-sort-value="0.68" | 680 m || 
|-id=922 bgcolor=#fefefe
| 453922 ||  || — || October 10, 2007 || Mount Lemmon || Mount Lemmon Survey || MAS || align=right data-sort-value="0.60" | 600 m || 
|-id=923 bgcolor=#fefefe
| 453923 ||  || — || September 3, 2007 || Catalina || CSS || — || align=right data-sort-value="0.74" | 740 m || 
|-id=924 bgcolor=#fefefe
| 453924 ||  || — || October 9, 2007 || Socorro || LINEAR || — || align=right | 1.1 km || 
|-id=925 bgcolor=#E9E9E9
| 453925 ||  || — || November 14, 2007 || Kitt Peak || Spacewatch || — || align=right data-sort-value="0.80" | 800 m || 
|-id=926 bgcolor=#fefefe
| 453926 ||  || — || October 19, 2007 || Mount Lemmon || Mount Lemmon Survey || — || align=right data-sort-value="0.62" | 620 m || 
|-id=927 bgcolor=#E9E9E9
| 453927 ||  || — || December 18, 2007 || Catalina || CSS || — || align=right | 1.4 km || 
|-id=928 bgcolor=#fefefe
| 453928 ||  || — || March 17, 2005 || Mount Lemmon || Mount Lemmon Survey || — || align=right data-sort-value="0.87" | 870 m || 
|-id=929 bgcolor=#E9E9E9
| 453929 ||  || — || November 18, 2011 || Catalina || CSS || — || align=right | 2.1 km || 
|-id=930 bgcolor=#E9E9E9
| 453930 ||  || — || November 13, 2007 || Kitt Peak || Spacewatch || (5) || align=right data-sort-value="0.77" | 770 m || 
|-id=931 bgcolor=#E9E9E9
| 453931 ||  || — || October 31, 2011 || Kitt Peak || Spacewatch || — || align=right | 1.4 km || 
|-id=932 bgcolor=#E9E9E9
| 453932 ||  || — || May 10, 2005 || Kitt Peak || Spacewatch || — || align=right | 1.7 km || 
|-id=933 bgcolor=#E9E9E9
| 453933 ||  || — || April 19, 2010 || WISE || WISE || — || align=right | 1.6 km || 
|-id=934 bgcolor=#E9E9E9
| 453934 ||  || — || November 2, 2011 || Mount Lemmon || Mount Lemmon Survey || — || align=right | 4.0 km || 
|-id=935 bgcolor=#E9E9E9
| 453935 ||  || — || December 30, 2007 || Mount Lemmon || Mount Lemmon Survey || — || align=right data-sort-value="0.66" | 660 m || 
|-id=936 bgcolor=#E9E9E9
| 453936 ||  || — || November 12, 2007 || Mount Lemmon || Mount Lemmon Survey || (5) || align=right data-sort-value="0.93" | 930 m || 
|-id=937 bgcolor=#E9E9E9
| 453937 ||  || — || November 28, 2011 || Mount Lemmon || Mount Lemmon Survey || — || align=right | 1.6 km || 
|-id=938 bgcolor=#E9E9E9
| 453938 ||  || — || December 27, 2011 || Catalina || CSS || — || align=right | 2.7 km || 
|-id=939 bgcolor=#E9E9E9
| 453939 ||  || — || September 20, 2006 || Catalina || CSS || — || align=right | 1.7 km || 
|-id=940 bgcolor=#d6d6d6
| 453940 ||  || — || December 24, 2011 || Mount Lemmon || Mount Lemmon Survey || — || align=right | 2.5 km || 
|-id=941 bgcolor=#E9E9E9
| 453941 ||  || — || February 8, 2008 || Mount Lemmon || Mount Lemmon Survey || — || align=right | 2.3 km || 
|-id=942 bgcolor=#d6d6d6
| 453942 ||  || — || November 22, 2006 || Mount Lemmon || Mount Lemmon Survey || — || align=right | 2.3 km || 
|-id=943 bgcolor=#E9E9E9
| 453943 ||  || — || January 30, 2008 || Mount Lemmon || Mount Lemmon Survey || — || align=right | 1.0 km || 
|-id=944 bgcolor=#E9E9E9
| 453944 ||  || — || December 31, 2002 || Socorro || LINEAR || — || align=right | 1.9 km || 
|-id=945 bgcolor=#E9E9E9
| 453945 ||  || — || September 17, 2006 || Catalina || CSS || EUN || align=right | 1.2 km || 
|-id=946 bgcolor=#E9E9E9
| 453946 ||  || — || November 28, 2011 || Mount Lemmon || Mount Lemmon Survey || ADE || align=right | 1.9 km || 
|-id=947 bgcolor=#E9E9E9
| 453947 ||  || — || December 30, 2011 || Kitt Peak || Spacewatch || — || align=right | 1.9 km || 
|-id=948 bgcolor=#E9E9E9
| 453948 ||  || — || April 15, 2004 || Socorro || LINEAR || EUN || align=right | 1.4 km || 
|-id=949 bgcolor=#E9E9E9
| 453949 ||  || — || March 10, 2008 || Mount Lemmon || Mount Lemmon Survey || — || align=right | 1.7 km || 
|-id=950 bgcolor=#E9E9E9
| 453950 ||  || — || December 24, 2011 || Catalina || CSS || — || align=right | 2.5 km || 
|-id=951 bgcolor=#E9E9E9
| 453951 ||  || — || November 15, 2006 || Catalina || CSS || — || align=right | 2.0 km || 
|-id=952 bgcolor=#E9E9E9
| 453952 ||  || — || August 28, 2006 || Kitt Peak || Spacewatch || — || align=right | 1.1 km || 
|-id=953 bgcolor=#E9E9E9
| 453953 ||  || — || October 13, 2006 || Kitt Peak || Spacewatch || — || align=right | 1.3 km || 
|-id=954 bgcolor=#fefefe
| 453954 ||  || — || January 14, 2012 || Mount Lemmon || Mount Lemmon Survey || — || align=right data-sort-value="0.94" | 940 m || 
|-id=955 bgcolor=#E9E9E9
| 453955 ||  || — || July 10, 2010 || WISE || WISE || — || align=right | 1.6 km || 
|-id=956 bgcolor=#E9E9E9
| 453956 ||  || — || October 16, 2007 || Kitt Peak || Spacewatch || — || align=right | 2.8 km || 
|-id=957 bgcolor=#E9E9E9
| 453957 ||  || — || January 19, 2012 || Kitt Peak || Spacewatch || — || align=right | 1.9 km || 
|-id=958 bgcolor=#d6d6d6
| 453958 ||  || — || January 24, 2007 || Mount Lemmon || Mount Lemmon Survey || — || align=right | 3.0 km || 
|-id=959 bgcolor=#E9E9E9
| 453959 ||  || — || March 6, 2008 || Mount Lemmon || Mount Lemmon Survey || — || align=right | 1.6 km || 
|-id=960 bgcolor=#E9E9E9
| 453960 ||  || — || January 10, 2008 || Mount Lemmon || Mount Lemmon Survey || RAF || align=right data-sort-value="0.88" | 880 m || 
|-id=961 bgcolor=#E9E9E9
| 453961 ||  || — || January 21, 2012 || Kitt Peak || Spacewatch || — || align=right | 1.6 km || 
|-id=962 bgcolor=#E9E9E9
| 453962 ||  || — || March 31, 2008 || Catalina || CSS || — || align=right | 1.9 km || 
|-id=963 bgcolor=#E9E9E9
| 453963 ||  || — || November 26, 2011 || Mount Lemmon || Mount Lemmon Survey || — || align=right | 2.6 km || 
|-id=964 bgcolor=#d6d6d6
| 453964 ||  || — || December 2, 2005 || Kitt Peak || Spacewatch || VER || align=right | 2.8 km || 
|-id=965 bgcolor=#E9E9E9
| 453965 ||  || — || December 27, 2011 || Mount Lemmon || Mount Lemmon Survey || (5) || align=right data-sort-value="0.81" | 810 m || 
|-id=966 bgcolor=#E9E9E9
| 453966 ||  || — || October 12, 2010 || Kitt Peak || Spacewatch || — || align=right | 1.6 km || 
|-id=967 bgcolor=#E9E9E9
| 453967 ||  || — || December 28, 2011 || Catalina || CSS || — || align=right | 2.2 km || 
|-id=968 bgcolor=#E9E9E9
| 453968 ||  || — || January 12, 2008 || Catalina || CSS || — || align=right | 1.0 km || 
|-id=969 bgcolor=#E9E9E9
| 453969 ||  || — || April 16, 2004 || Kitt Peak || Spacewatch || (5) || align=right data-sort-value="0.78" | 780 m || 
|-id=970 bgcolor=#E9E9E9
| 453970 ||  || — || January 26, 2012 || Kitt Peak || Spacewatch || — || align=right | 1.8 km || 
|-id=971 bgcolor=#E9E9E9
| 453971 ||  || — || September 28, 2006 || Mount Lemmon || Mount Lemmon Survey || JUN || align=right | 1.1 km || 
|-id=972 bgcolor=#E9E9E9
| 453972 ||  || — || October 14, 2007 || Mount Lemmon || Mount Lemmon Survey || (5) || align=right data-sort-value="0.81" | 810 m || 
|-id=973 bgcolor=#d6d6d6
| 453973 ||  || — || January 4, 2012 || Kitt Peak || Spacewatch || BRA || align=right | 1.3 km || 
|-id=974 bgcolor=#E9E9E9
| 453974 ||  || — || October 21, 2006 || Mount Lemmon || Mount Lemmon Survey || — || align=right | 1.5 km || 
|-id=975 bgcolor=#E9E9E9
| 453975 ||  || — || September 17, 2006 || Kitt Peak || Spacewatch || — || align=right data-sort-value="0.96" | 960 m || 
|-id=976 bgcolor=#E9E9E9
| 453976 ||  || — || September 26, 2006 || Kitt Peak || Spacewatch || — || align=right data-sort-value="0.71" | 710 m || 
|-id=977 bgcolor=#E9E9E9
| 453977 ||  || — || January 29, 2012 || Mount Lemmon || Mount Lemmon Survey || — || align=right | 1.9 km || 
|-id=978 bgcolor=#E9E9E9
| 453978 ||  || — || April 26, 2008 || Mount Lemmon || Mount Lemmon Survey || — || align=right | 2.0 km || 
|-id=979 bgcolor=#E9E9E9
| 453979 ||  || — || November 22, 2006 || Kitt Peak || Spacewatch || — || align=right | 1.9 km || 
|-id=980 bgcolor=#E9E9E9
| 453980 ||  || — || May 8, 2008 || Mount Lemmon || Mount Lemmon Survey || — || align=right | 2.2 km || 
|-id=981 bgcolor=#E9E9E9
| 453981 ||  || — || January 19, 2012 || Kitt Peak || Spacewatch || — || align=right | 2.1 km || 
|-id=982 bgcolor=#d6d6d6
| 453982 ||  || — || January 29, 2012 || Kitt Peak || Spacewatch || — || align=right | 2.2 km || 
|-id=983 bgcolor=#E9E9E9
| 453983 ||  || — || January 29, 2012 || Mount Lemmon || Mount Lemmon Survey || — || align=right | 1.1 km || 
|-id=984 bgcolor=#d6d6d6
| 453984 ||  || — || October 28, 2010 || Mount Lemmon || Mount Lemmon Survey || — || align=right | 2.4 km || 
|-id=985 bgcolor=#d6d6d6
| 453985 ||  || — || January 26, 2012 || Mount Lemmon || Mount Lemmon Survey || — || align=right | 1.9 km || 
|-id=986 bgcolor=#d6d6d6
| 453986 ||  || — || April 14, 2008 || Mount Lemmon || Mount Lemmon Survey || — || align=right | 2.3 km || 
|-id=987 bgcolor=#E9E9E9
| 453987 ||  || — || November 18, 2006 || Kitt Peak || Spacewatch || — || align=right | 2.0 km || 
|-id=988 bgcolor=#E9E9E9
| 453988 ||  || — || December 3, 2010 || Mount Lemmon || Mount Lemmon Survey || — || align=right | 1.5 km || 
|-id=989 bgcolor=#E9E9E9
| 453989 ||  || — || March 5, 2008 || Mount Lemmon || Mount Lemmon Survey || — || align=right | 2.3 km || 
|-id=990 bgcolor=#E9E9E9
| 453990 ||  || — || September 30, 2006 || Mount Lemmon || Mount Lemmon Survey || — || align=right | 1.3 km || 
|-id=991 bgcolor=#E9E9E9
| 453991 ||  || — || October 23, 2006 || Kitt Peak || Spacewatch || — || align=right | 1.3 km || 
|-id=992 bgcolor=#E9E9E9
| 453992 ||  || — || January 30, 2008 || Mount Lemmon || Mount Lemmon Survey || — || align=right data-sort-value="0.78" | 780 m || 
|-id=993 bgcolor=#E9E9E9
| 453993 ||  || — || May 3, 2005 || Kitt Peak || Spacewatch || — || align=right | 1.4 km || 
|-id=994 bgcolor=#E9E9E9
| 453994 ||  || — || November 16, 2006 || Kitt Peak || Spacewatch || — || align=right | 1.8 km || 
|-id=995 bgcolor=#d6d6d6
| 453995 ||  || — || September 17, 2009 || Mount Lemmon || Mount Lemmon Survey || — || align=right | 3.3 km || 
|-id=996 bgcolor=#E9E9E9
| 453996 ||  || — || March 6, 2008 || Catalina || CSS || — || align=right | 1.7 km || 
|-id=997 bgcolor=#d6d6d6
| 453997 ||  || — || December 27, 2005 || Kitt Peak || Spacewatch || — || align=right | 2.7 km || 
|-id=998 bgcolor=#d6d6d6
| 453998 ||  || — || March 12, 2007 || Kitt Peak || Spacewatch || — || align=right | 2.6 km || 
|-id=999 bgcolor=#E9E9E9
| 453999 ||  || — || April 1, 2008 || Mount Lemmon || Mount Lemmon Survey || (5) || align=right data-sort-value="0.91" | 910 m || 
|-id=000 bgcolor=#d6d6d6
| 454000 ||  || — || November 3, 2011 || Mount Lemmon || Mount Lemmon Survey || — || align=right | 3.4 km || 
|}

References

External links 
 Discovery Circumstances: Numbered Minor Planets (450001)–(455000) (IAU Minor Planet Center)

0453